= Veil of money =

The veil of money is the property assumed by some economists whereby money is a commodity like other commodities – such as oil or gold or food – as opposed to its having special properties.

This question arises in classical political economy, where John Stuart Mill argues that money is unimportant, and that while money might disguise the true values in an economy, it would only do so for a limited period of time. This was used to argue against government intervention in political economy as a waste of time. The problem expanded, however, as money swung back toward credit-based issuance of notes. What money meant, or was equivalent to, became important as governments attempted to adjust interest rates rather than maintain the gold standard.

In the 20th century the veil of money was used to describe questions of stability and the exchangeability of money for interest or commodity in a macroeconomic model. In essence, as long as money can be treated like a commodity, there is no stickiness between money and goods, or money and interest.

The veil of money and, as a related issue, the quantity theory of money have special importance in economic theory throughout the 20th century. Actually, 20th century economics can be interpreted as a sequence of theoretical answers to the question whether money is only a veil or not. Different theories can be judged by their implied ideas as to the neutrality of money. In the simplest models and in the simplest form of the quantity theory of money, money is completely neutral, that is, changes in the money supply do not affect anything real. However, in the more elaborated models the neutrality theorem was applied rather to long-run considerations. For both Milton Friedman and Robert E. Lucas money was not a mere veil in the short run, so money was assumed to have real effects in the short run. The mechanisms through which money could exert these real effects were radically different and so were the sets of assumptions these authors created to establish their models. For example, Friedman postulated adaptive expectations, while Lucas assumed his economic agents to be able to form rational expectations. For both of them, money was only neutral in the long-run – that is, money was not just a veil in the short-run – but the scope of countercyclical economic policy was radically curtailed in new classical macroeconomics. In the case of rational expectations the monetary authority is not able to carry out systematic countercyclical economic policy – that is, it cannot exploit the existing short-run Phillips curve. However, it can be realized that if any of the conditions necessary to the ineffectiveness of systematic economic policy is not met, economic policy can be effective again, so, money is not only a veil.

== See also ==
- Money illusion
- Neutrality of money
- Real versus nominal value
