= Lucas aggregate supply function =

The Lucas aggregate supply function or Lucas "surprise" supply function, based on the Lucas imperfect information model, is a representation of aggregate supply based on the work of new classical economist Robert Lucas. The model states that economic output is a function of money or price "surprise". The model accounts for the empirically based trade off between output and prices represented by the Phillips curve, but the function breaks from the Phillips curve since only unanticipated price level changes lead to changes in output. The model accounts for empirically observed short-run correlations between output and prices, but maintains the neutrality of money (the absence of a price or money supply relationship with output and employment) in the long-run. The policy ineffectiveness proposition extends the model by arguing that, since people with rational expectations cannot be systematically surprised by monetary policy, monetary policy cannot be used to systematically influence the economy.

== Background ==
New classical economics made its first attempt to model aggregate supply in Lucas and Leonard Rapping (1969). In this earlier model, supply (specifically labor supply) is a direct function of real wages: more work will be done when real wages are high and less when they are low. Under this model, unemployment is "voluntary". In 1972 Lucas made a second attempt at modelling aggregate supply. This attempt drew from Milton Friedman's natural rate hypothesis that challenged the Phillips curve. Lucas supported his original, theoretical paper that outlined the surprise based supply curve with an empirical paper that demonstrated that countries with a history of stable price levels exhibit larger effects in response to monetary policy than countries where prices have been volatile.

On the basis of Lucas' 1973 paper, Thomas Sargent and Neil Wallace introduced their 'surprise' supply function in which there was a white noise error term introduced that cannot be predicted in any way. Lucas introduced the effects of nominal and real shocks affecting a macro-economy into his system through price expectations: if expectations are true, output in any given period is at its natural level. However, the well-known and widely accepted aggregate production function described by Sargent and Wallace also provides leeway for the white-noise shocks independent of price expectations–resulting in the accidental nature of equilibrium and in the inefficacy of countercyclical efforts of monetary policy.

Lucas's model dominated new classical economic business cycle theory until 1982 when real business cycle theory, starting with Finn E. Kydland and Edward C. Prescott, replaced Lucas's theory of a money driven business cycle with a strictly supply based model that used technology and other real shocks to explain fluctuations in output.

== Theory ==
The rationale behind Lucas's supply theory centers on how suppliers get information. Lucas claimed that suppliers had to respond to a "signal extraction" problem when making decisions based on prices; the firms had to determine what portion of price changes in their respective industries reflected a general change in nominal prices (inflation) and what portion reflected a change in real prices for inputs and outputs. Lucas hypothesized that suppliers know their own industries better than the general economy. Given this imbalance in information, a supplier could perceive a general increase in prices due to inflation as an increase the relative price for its output, reflecting a better, real price for its output and encouraging more production. The surprise leads to an increase in production and employment throughout the economy.

The function can be represented simply as:

$$Y_s = f(P-P_{expected})$$

The simple version models aggregate output as a function of the price surprise. A more complicated expression of the Lucas supply curve adds expectations to the model. Aggregate supply is a function of the “natural” level of output ($Y_{N_t}$) and the difference between actual prices ($P_t$) and the expected price level given past information $\Omega_{t-1}$ times a coefficient based on an economy's sensitivity to price surprises ($\alpha$):

$$Y_s = Y_{N_t} + \alpha [  P_t  -  E\left(P_t |  \Omega_{t-1} \right) ]$$

By invoking Okun's law to express the function in terms of unemployment, Lucas's supply function can be viewed as an expression of the expectations-augmented Phillips curve.

== See also ==
- Lucas islands model
