= Real economy =

Production, distribution and consumption of goods and services; distinct from finance

The real economy concerns the production, purchase and flow of goods and services (like oil, bread and labour) within an economy. It is contrasted with the financial economy, which concerns the aspects of the economy that deal purely in transactions of money and other financial assets, which represent ownership or claims to ownership of real sector goods and services.

In the real economy, spending is considered to be "real" as money is used to effect non-notional transactions, for example wages paid to employees to enact labour, bills paid for provision of fuel, or food purchased for consumption. The transaction includes the deliverance of something other than money or a financial asset. In this way, the real economy is focused on the activities that allow human beings to directly satisfy their needs and desires, apart from any speculative considerations. Economists became increasingly interested in the real economy (and its interaction with the financial economy) in the late 20th century as a result of increased global financialization, described by Krippner as "a pattern of accumulation in which profits accrue primarily through financial channels rather than through trade and commodity production".

The real sector is sensitive to the effect liquidity has on asset prices like, for example, if the market is saturated and asset prices collapse. In the real sector this uncertainty can mean a slowdown in aggregate demand (and in the monetary sector, an increase in the demand for money).

== Schools of thought ==
In the neoclassical school of economics, the classical dichotomy dictates that real and nominal values in the economy can be analysed distinctly. Thus, the real sector value is determined by an actor's tastes and preferences and the cost of production, while the monetary sector only plays the part of influencing the price level, so in this simplified example the role of the supply and demand is generally limited to the quantity theory of money).

Keynesian theory rejects the classical dichotomy. Keynesians and monetarists reject it on the basis that prices are sticky – prices fail to adjust in the short run, so that an increase in the money supply raises aggregate demand and thus alters real macroeconomic variables. Post-Keynesians reject the classic dichotomy as well, for different reasons, emphasizing the role of banks in creating money, as in monetary circuit theory.

Dichotomous market theory proposes that real sector outcomes are independent of the monetary sector, related also to the idea of money neutrality.

== Real property ==
Higher interest rates in the 1980s and 1990s reduced cash flows and decreased asset prices in several OECD countries especially as declining prices in real estate and loan losses reduced equity in the banking sector lending decreased. As real estate values declined sharply in the Northeastern United States lending also decreased.

== Real variables ==
Since the real economy refers to all real or non financial elements of an economy, it can be modeled by using only real variables, which don't need a monetary system to be represented. In this way, real variables are:

- Wages: don't need to be expressed in monetary term, they can be expressed in real terms in any real unit
  - Ex: 5 oranges for an hour of work (this is related to the concept of purchasing power parity, which can be expressed in the Big Mac Index)
- Output: can be expressed in terms of real unit
  - Ex: a furniture company produces 20 tables and 40 chairs per day

== Financial vs. real economy ==
According to the classical dichotomy, the nominal and real economy could be analyzed separately. Mainstream economists often see financial markets as a means of equilibrating savings and investments, intertemporally allocated towards their best usage anchored by fundamentals within the economy. Banks thus act as an intermediary between savings and investments. Financial markets according to the efficient-market hypothesis are deemed to be efficient based on all available information. The market interest rate is determined by the supply and demand for loanable funds.

There is some disagreement as to whether the financial sector and asset markets impact the real economy. Economist Mathias Binswanger demonstrated that since the 1980s, the results of the stock market do not seem to lead to increases in real economic activity, in contrast to the results found in Fama (1990), who found that increases in the stock market appear to lead to increases in the real economy. Binswanger attributes this difference based on the possibility of speculative bubbles for the economy during the 1980s and 1990s. Through analyzing seven countries, economist Kateřina Krchnivá found that an increase in the stock market predicts an increase in the real economy with the lag of one quarter, without any feedback relationship existing the other way around.

Irving Fischer developed the theory of debt deflation during the Great Depression to explain the linkages between the financial sector and the real economy. In his model, recessions and depressions are caused by an overall rise in the real debt level thanks to deflation. As a result, debt liquidation occurs followed by distress selling and a contraction of deposit currency. This leads to a further decrease in the price level and a wave of business bankruptcies, creating a drop in output, trade and employment. Pessimism and loss of confidence occur, leading to further hoarding and slower circulation of currency causing complicated disturbances in the interest rate. Fischer's remedy for when this sequence of events occur is to reflate prices back to its initial level, preventing that "vicious spiral" of debt deflation.

Alternatively, John Maynard Keynes proposed the idea of liquidity preference as a means to explain how changes in investors' liquidity based on their unstable preferences in financial markets could lead to changes in real variables like output and employment. Thus, under conditions of fundamental uncertainty, liquidity becomes highly attractive to investors. Keynesian economics is concerned with ways of shaping investors' liquidity preference through monetary and fiscal policy channels in order to achieve Full Employment. The monetary authority can encourage more private investment through a reduction in the interest rate, while fiscal policy, a positive trade balance and housing credit expansions can also lead to further growth in the real economy.
