= Classical dichotomy =

Idea that real and nominal variables can be analysed separately

In macroeconomics, the classical dichotomy is the idea, attributed to classical and pre-Keynesian economics, that real and nominal variables can be analyzed separately. To be precise, an economy exhibits the classical dichotomy if real variables such as output and real interest rates can be completely analyzed without considering what is happening to their nominal counterparts, the money value of output and the interest rate. In particular, this means that real GDP and other real variables can be determined without knowing the level of the nominal money supply or the rate of inflation. An economy exhibits the classical dichotomy if money is neutral, affecting only the price level, not real variables. As such, if the classical dichotomy holds, money only affects absolute rather than the relative prices between goods.

The classical dichotomy was integral to the thinking of some pre-Keynesian economists ("money as a veil") as a long-run proposition and is found today in new classical theories of macroeconomics. In new classical macroeconomics there is a short-run Phillips curve which can shift vertically according to the rational expectations being reviewed continuously. In the strict sense, money is not neutral in the short-run, that is, classical dichotomy does not hold, since agents tend to respond to changes in prices and in the quantity of money through changing their supply decisions. However, money should be neutral in the long run, and the classical dichotomy should be restored in the long-run, since there was no relationship between prices and real macroeconomic performance at the data level. This view has serious economic policy consequences. In the long-run, owing to the dichotomy, money is not assumed to be an effective instrument in controlling macroeconomic performance, while in the short-run there is a trade-off between prices and output (or unemployment), but, owing to rational expectations, government cannot exploit it in order to build a systematic countercyclical economic policy.

Keynesians and monetarists reject the classical dichotomy, because they argue that prices are sticky. That is, they think prices fail to adjust in the short run, so that an increase in the money supply raises aggregate demand and thus alters real macroeconomic variables. Post-Keynesians reject the classic dichotomy as well, for different reasons, emphasizing the role of banks in creating money, as in monetary circuit theory.
