= Lucas islands model =

Economic model

The Lucas islands model is an economic model of the link between money supply and price and output changes in a simplified economy using rational expectations. It delivered a new classical explanation of the Phillips curve relationship between unemployment and inflation. The model was formulated by Robert Lucas, Jr. in a series of papers in the 1970s.

== Description ==
The model contains a group of N islands, with one individual on each. Each individual produces some quantity Y, which can be bought for some amount of money M. Individuals use money a given number of times to buy a certain quantity of goods which cost a certain price. In the quantity theory of money, this is expressed as MV = PY, where money supply times velocity equals price times output.

Lucas then introduced variation in the price level. This can occur through changes in the local price level of individual islands due to increased or decreased demand (i.e. asymmetric preferences, z) or through stochastic processes (randomness) that cannot be predicted (e). However, the island dweller only observes the nominal price change, not the component price changes. Essentially, all prices can be rising, in which case the islander wants to produce the same, as his real income is the same, which is shown by (e). Or the price of his product is rising and others are not, which is z, in which case he wants to increase supply due to a higher price. The islander wishes to respond to z but not to e, but since he can only see the total price change p (p = z + e), he makes errors. Due to this, if the money supply is expanded, causing general inflation, he will increase production even though he is not receiving as high of a price as he thinks (he confuses some of the price as an increase in z). This exhibits a Phillips curve relationship, as inflation is positively related with output (i.e. inflation is negatively related with unemployment). However, and this is the point, the existence of a short-run Phillips curve does not make the central bank capable of exploiting this relationship in a systematic way. Although economic agents are expected to respond to changes in the price level, the central bank is not able to control the real economy. Since erratic changes may occur in the macroeconomic environment (interpreted as white noises) and agents are assumed to be fully rational, controlling the real economy (unemployment and production) is possible only through surprises (or, in other words, unexpected monetary policy actions) which, however, cannot be systematic.

The twist is that due to the rational expectations included in the model, the islander isn't tricked by long-run inflation, as he incorporates this into his predictions and correctly identifies this as pi (long-run trend inflation) and not z. This is essentially the policy ineffectiveness proposition. This means in the long-run, inflation cannot induce increases in output, which means the Phillips curve is vertical.

An important consequence of the Lucas islands model is that it requires that we distinguish between anticipated and unanticipated changes in monetary policy. If changes in monetary policy and the resulting changes in inflation are anticipated, then the islanders are not misled by any price changes that they observe. Consequently, they will not adjust production and the neutrality of money occurs even in the short-run. With unanticipated changes in inflation, the islanders face the imperfect information problem and will adjust production. Therefore, monetary policy can influence output only as long as it surprises individuals and firms in an economy.

== See also ==
- Phillips curve
- New classical macroeconomics
- Neutrality of money
