= Paul Sultan =

Paul Sultan was a labour economist, born in 1924 in Vancouver, Canada, died in 2019 Edwardsville, Illinois

== Education ==
After serving as an aircraft pilot during World War II for the Royal Canadian Air Force, he pursued an academic career at Cornell University, the University at Buffalo, Claremont Graduate School in California, UCLA, Simon Fraser University and the University of Southern Illinois.

== Writings ==
His early text, Labour Economics, pioneered the relationship between the inflation rate and the unemployment rate, now known as the Phillips curve, which Sultan was the first to represent as a graph. Sultan has written five books and hundreds of articles, monographs and position papers. In recognition of his work in labour-management relations he was honoured in 1997 through being admitted to the Southwestern Illinois Labour Management Hall of Fame.
