= Large-scale macroeconometric model =

Following the development of Keynesian economics, applied economics began developing forecasting models based on economic data including national income and product accounting data. In contrast with typical textbook models, these large-scale macroeconometric models used large amounts of data and based forecasts on past correlations instead of theoretical relations. These models estimated the relations between different macroeconomic variables using regression analysis on time series data. These models grew to include hundreds or thousands of equations describing the evolution of hundreds or thousands of prices and quantities over time, making computers essential for their solution. While the choice of which variables to include in each equation was partly guided by economic theory (for example, including past income as a determinant of consumption, as suggested by the theory of adaptive expectations), variable inclusion was mostly determined on purely empirical grounds. Large-scale macroeconometric model consists of systems of dynamic equations of the economy with the estimation of parameters using time-series data on a quarterly to yearly basis.

Macroeconometric models have a supply and a demand side for estimation of these parameters. Kydland and Prescott call it the system of equations approach. Large-scale macroeconometric model can be defined as a set of stochastic equations with definitional and institutional relationships denoting the behaviour of economic agents. The supply side determines the steady state properties of the macroeconometric model. The macroeconometric model designed by the model builder is significantly influenced by his interests, information, purpose behind its construction, time and financial constraints in the research. The size and nature of the model will change based on the considerations above while building the same. According to Pesaran and Smith the macroeconometric model must have three basic characteristics viz. relevance, adequacy and consistency. Relevance means the model must be according to the requirements of the desired output. Consistency will expect the model to be inline with the existing theory and inner working of the described system. Adequacy explains the model to be better in terms of its predictive performance. The main objective of the model decides its size. In the current scenario there is an increasing interest in the use of these large-scale macroeonometric models for theory evaluation, impact analysis, policy simulation and forecasting purposes.

Large-scale macroeconometric models were criticized by Robert Lucas in his critique. Lucas argued that models should be based on theory, not on empirical correlations. Because the parameters of those models were not structural, i.e. not policy-invariant, they would necessarily change whenever policy (the rules of the game) was changed, leading to potentially misleading conclusions. Only a model based on theory could account for shifting policy environments. Lucas and other new classical economists were especially critical of the use of large-scale macroeconometric models to evaluate policy impacts when they were purportedly sensitive to policy changes. Lucas summarized his critique:

Given that the structure of an econometric model consists of optimal decision rules of economic agents, and that optimal decision rules vary systematically with changes in the structure of series relevant to the decision maker, it follows that any change in policy will systematically alter the structure of econometric models.

Tinbergen developed the first comprehensive national model, which he first built for the Netherlands and later applied to the United States and the United Kingdom after World War II. The first global macroeconomic model, Wharton Econometric Forecasting Associates' LINK project, was initiated by Lawrence Klein. The model was cited in 1980 when Klein, like Tinbergen before him, won the Nobel Prize in Economics. Large-scale empirical models of this type, including the Wharton model, are still in use as of 2011, especially for forecasting purposes.

== List ==
- MFMod – World Bank
- Project LINK at Wharton
- MIT-Penn-Social Science Research Council

== See also ==
- Macroeconomic model
- Time series
- Lucas critique
- Dynamic stochastic general equilibrium
- Consensus forecast
