= Policy-ineffectiveness proposition =

Economic theory

The policy-ineffectiveness proposition (PIP) is a new classical theory proposed in 1975 by Thomas J. Sargent and Neil Wallace based upon the theory of rational expectations, which posits that monetary policy cannot systematically manage the levels of output and employment in the economy.

== Theory ==
Prior to the work of Sargent and Wallace, macroeconomic models were largely based on the adaptive expectations assumption. Many economists found this unsatisfactory since it assumes that agents may repeatedly make systematic errors and can only revise their expectations in a backward-looking way. Under adaptive expectations, agents do not revise their expectations even if the government announces a policy that involves increasing money supply beyond its expected growth level. Revisions would only be made after the increase in the money supply has occurred, and even then agents would react only gradually. In each period that agents found their expectations of inflation to be wrong, a certain proportion of agents' forecasting error would be incorporated into their initial expectations. Therefore, equilibrium in the economy would only be converged upon and never reached. The government would be able to maintain employment above its natural level and easily manipulate the economy.

This behavior by agents is contrary to that which is assumed by much of economics. Economics has firm foundations in assumption of rationality, so the systematic errors made by agents in macroeconomic theory were considered unsatisfactory by Sargent and Wallace. More importantly, this behavior seemed inconsistent with the stagflation of the 1970s, when high inflation coincided with high unemployment, and attempts by policymakers to actively manage the economy in a Keynesian manner were largely counterproductive. When applying rational expectations within a macroeconomic framework, Sargent and Wallace produced the policy-ineffectiveness proposition, according to which the government could not successfully intervene in the economy if attempting to manipulate output. If the government employed monetary expansion in order to increase output, agents would foresee the effects, and wage and price expectations would be revised upwards accordingly. Real wages would remain constant and therefore so would output; no money illusion occurs. Only stochastic shocks to the economy can cause deviations in employment from its natural level.

Taken at face value, the theory appeared to be a major blow to a substantial proportion of macroeconomics, particularly Keynesian economics. However, criticisms of the theory were quick to follow its publication.

== Criticisms ==
The Sargent and Wallace model has been criticised by a wide range of economists. Some, like Milton Friedman, have questioned the validity of the rational expectations assumption. Sanford Grossman and Joseph Stiglitz argued that even if agents had the cognitive ability to form rational expectations, they would be unable to profit from the resultant information since their actions would then reveal their information to others. Therefore, agents would not expend the effort or money required to become informed and government policy would remain effective.

The New Keynesian economists Stanley Fischer (1977) and Edmund Phelps and John B. Taylor (1977) assumed that workers sign nominal wage contracts that last for more than one period, making wages "sticky". With this assumption the model shows government policy is fully effective since, although workers rationally expect the outcome of a change in policy, they are unable to respond to it as they are locked into expectations formed when they signed their wage contract. Not only is it possible for government policy to be used effectively, but its use is also desirable. The government is able to respond to stochastic shocks in the economy which agents are unable to react to, and so stabilise output and employment.

The Barro–Gordon model showed how the ability of government to manipulate output would lead to inflationary bias. The government would be able to cheat agents and force unemployment below its natural level but would not wish to do so. The role of government would therefore be limited to output stabilisation.

Since it was possible to incorporate the rational expectations hypothesis into macroeconomic models whilst avoiding the stark conclusions that Sargent and Wallace reached, the policy-ineffectiveness proposition has had less of a lasting impact on macroeconomic reality than first may have been expected. In fact, Sargent himself admitted that macroeconomic policy could have nontrivial effects, even under the rational expectations assumption, in the preface to the 1987 edition of his textbook Dynamic Macroeconomic Theory:

'The first edition appeared at a time when discussions of the 'policy-ineffectiveness proposition' occupied much of the attention of macroeconomists. As work of John B. Taylor has made clear, the methodological and computational implications of the hypothesis of rational expectations for the theory of optimal macroeconomic policy far transcend the question of whether we accept or reject particular models embodying particular neutrality propositions... The current edition contains many more examples of models in which a government faces a nontrivial policy choice than did the earlier edition.'

Despite the criticisms, Anatole Kaletsky has described Sargent and Wallace's proposition as a significant contributor to the displacement of Keynesianism from its role as the leading economic theory guiding the governments of advanced nations.

== Reception ==
While the policy-ineffectiveness proposition has been debated, its validity can be defended on methodological grounds. To do so, one has to realize its conditional character. For new classicals, countercyclical stimulation of aggregate demand through monetary policy instruments is neither possible nor beneficial if the assumptions of the theory hold. If expectations are rational and if markets are characterized by completely flexible nominal quantities and if shocks are unforeseeable white noises, then macroeconomic systems can deviate from the equilibrium level only under contingencies (i.e. random shocks). However, no systematic countercyclical monetary policy can be built on these conditions, since even monetary policy makers cannot foresee these shocks hitting economies, so no planned response is possible. According to the common and traditional judgement, new classical macroeconomics brought the inefficiency of economic policy into the limelight. Moreover, these statements are always undermined by the fact that new classical assumptions are too far from life-world conditions to plausibly underlie the theorems. So, it has to be realized that the precise design of the assumptions underlying the policy-ineffectiveness proposition makes the most influential, though highly ignored and misunderstood, scientific development of new classical macroeconomics. New classicals did not assert simply that activist economic policy (in a narrow sense: monetary policy) is ineffective. Robert Lucas and his followers drew the attention to the conditions under which this inefficiency probably emerges.

== See also ==
- Neutrality of money
- Sticky wages and prices

=== Related theories ===
- Ricardian equivalence
- Say's law
- Treasury view
