= H. Gregg Lewis =

American economist

- Born: May 9, 1914; Homer, Michigan
- Died: January 25, 1992 (aged 77); Chapel Hill, North Carolina

Academic background
- Education: University of Chicago
- Doctoral advisor: Henry Schultz
- Influences: Paul Douglas

Academic work
- Discipline: Labor economics
- School or tradition: Chicago school of economics
- Institutions: Duke University; Cowles Commission; University of Chicago
- Doctoral students: Albert Rees; Gary Becker; Walter Oi; Robert Lucas Jr. Sherwin Rosen

Harold Gregg Lewis (May 9, 1914 – January 25, 1992) was an American economist notable for his contributions in labor economics. He was considered a principal member of the monetarist, free-market-oriented Chicago school of economics. He received the Quantrell Award.

A native of Homer, Michigan, Lewis earned his bachelor's degree and Ph.D. from the University of Chicago. He stayed as a faculty member until 1975, when he moved to Duke University.
