= Neil Wallace =

American economist

- Born: 1939 (age 86–87); New York City, U.S.

Academic background
- Education: University of Chicago; Columbia University
- Doctoral advisor: Milton Friedman
- Influences: John Muth; Robert Lucas, Jr.

Academic work
- Discipline: Monetary economics
- School or tradition: New classical economics
- Institutions: Penn State University; University of Miami; University of Minnesota
- Doctoral students: Robert M. Townsend; S. Rao Aiyagari; Randall Wright; Lars Ljungqvist; Per Krusell
- Website: Information at IDEAS / RePEc

Neil Wallace (born 1939) is an American economist and professor of economics at Penn State University. He is considered one of the main proponents of new classical macroeconomics in the field of economics.

== Early life and education ==
Wallace was born in 1939, in New York City. He attended Columbia University, where he earned a BA in economics in 1960 and his Ph.D in economics from the University of Chicago in 1964, where he studied under Nobel Prize-winning economist Milton Friedman.

== Career ==
In 1969, Wallace was hired as a consultant to the Federal Reserve Bank of Minneapolis. He served as a professor at the University of Minnesota from 1974 until 1994 and as a professor at the University of Miami from 1994 until 1997. In 1997, he was hired as a professor at Penn State.

In 1975, he and Thomas J. Sargent proposed the policy-ineffectiveness proposition, which refuted a basic assumption of Keynesian economics. In 2012, he was elected Distinguished Fellow of the American Economic Association.

== Selected publications ==
- Ricardo De O. Cavalcanti and Neil Wallace, 1999. "Inside and Outside Money as Alternative Media of Exchange," Journal of Money, Credit and Banking, 31(3, Part 2), pp. 443–457.
- Thomas J. Sargent and Neil Wallace, "Rational Expectations and the Dynamics of Hyperinflation," International Economic Review, 14(2), (Jun., 1973), pp. 328–350.
- _____ and _____, 1973. The Stability of Models of Money and Growth with Perfect Foresight," Econometrica, 41(6), pp. 1043–1048.
- Sargent, Thomas & Wallace, Neil (1975). "'Rational' Expectations, the Optimal Monetary Instrument, and the Optimal Money Supply Rule". Journal of Political Economy. 83 (2): 241–254. doi:10.1086/260321. S2CID 154301791.
- Sargent, Thomas & Wallace, Neil (1976). "Rational Expectations and the Theory of Economic Policy" (PDF). Journal of Monetary Economics. 2 (2): 169–183. doi:10.1016/0304-3932(76)90032-5.
- _____ and _____, 1981. "Some Unpleasant Monetarist Arithmetic," Federal Reserve Bank of Minneapolis Quarterly Review, 5(3), pp. 1–17.
- Neil Wallace, 1980. The Overlapping Generations Model of Fiat Money," in Models of Monetary Economies, Federal Reserve Bank of Minneapolis, pp. 49–82. Abstract.
- _____, 2001. "Whither Monetary Economics?," International Economic Review, 42(4), pp. p. 847–869.
- Neil Wallace and Rodney Garratt, 2018. "Bitcoin 1, Bitcoin 2, ...: An Experiment in Privately Issued Outside Moneys," Economic Inquiry, 56(3), 1887-1897.
