= Neutrality of money =

Economic theory

Neutrality of money is the idea that a change in the money supply affects only nominal variables in the economy such as prices, wages, and exchange rates, with no effect on real variables, like employment, real GDP, and real consumption. Neutrality of money is an important idea in classical economics and is related to the classical dichotomy. It implies that the central bank does not affect the real economy (e.g., the number of jobs, the size of real GDP, the amount of real investment) by creating money. Instead, any increase in the supply of money would be offset by a proportional rise in prices and wages. This assumption underlies some mainstream macroeconomic models (e.g. real business cycle theory, which models the response of the economy to shocks in real variables). However, economists generally find that money is neutral only in the long run; in the short run, price stickiness means changes in the money supply can produce changes in real variables such as employment.

Superneutrality of money is a stronger property than neutrality of money. It holds that not only is the real economy unaffected by the level of the money supply but also that the rate of money supply growth has no effect on real variables. In this case, nominal wages and prices remain proportional to the nominal money supply not only in response to one-time permanent changes in the nominal money supply but also in response to permanent changes in the growth rate of the nominal money supply. Typically superneutrality is addressed in the context of long-run models.

== History of the concept ==
According to Don Patinkin, the concept of monetary neutrality goes back as far as David Hume. The term itself was first used by continental economists beginning at the turn of the 20th century, and exploded as a special topic in the English language economic literature upon Friedrich Hayek's introduction of the term and concept in his famous 1931 LSE lectures published as Prices and Production. Keynes rejected neutrality of money both in the short term and in the long term.

== Views and counterviews ==
Many economists maintain that money neutrality is a good approximation for how the economy behaves over long periods of time but that in the short run monetary-disequilibrium theory applies, such that the nominal money supply would affect output. One argument is that prices and especially wages are sticky (because of menu costs, etc.), and cannot be adjusted immediately to an unexpected change in the money supply. An alternative explanation for real economic effects of money supply changes is not that people cannot change prices but that they do not realize that it is in their interest to do so. The bounded rationality approach suggests that small contractions in the money supply are not taken into account when individuals sell their houses or look for work, and that they will therefore spend longer searching for a completed contract than without the monetary contraction. Furthermore, the floor on nominal wages changes imposed by most companies is observed to be zero: an arbitrary number by the theory of monetary neutrality but a psychological threshold due to money illusion.

Neutrality of money has been a central question for monetarism. The most important answers were elaborated within the framework of the Phillips curve. Milton Friedman, assuming adaptive expectations, distinguished a series of short-run Phillips curves and a long-run one, where the short-run curves were supposed to be the conventional, negatively sloped curves, while the long-run curve was actually a vertical line indicating the natural rate of unemployment. According to Friedman, money was not neutral in the short run, because economic agents, confused by the money illusion, always respond to changes in the money supply. If the monetary authority chooses to increase the stock of money and, hence, the price level, agents will be never able to distinguish real and nominal changes, so they will regard the increase in nominal wages as real modifications, so labour supply will also be boosted. However, this change is only temporary, since agents will soon realize the actual state of affairs. As the higher wages were accompanied by higher prices, no real changes in income occurred, that is, it was no need to increase the labour supply. In the end, the economy, after this short detour, will return to the starting point, or in other words, to the natural rate of unemployment.

New classical macroeconomics, led by Robert E. Lucas, also has its own Phillips curve. However, things are far more complicated in these models, since rational expectations were presumed. For Lucas, the islands model made up the general framework in which the mechanisms underlying the Phillips curve could be scrutinized. The purpose of the first Lucasian island model (1972) was to establish a framework to support the understanding of the nature of the relationship between inflation and real economic performance by assuming that this relation offers no trade-off exploitable by economic policy. Lucas' intention was to prove that the Phillips curve exists without existing. It has been a heritage that there is a trade-off between inflation and unemployment or real economic performance, so it is undoubted that there is a short run Phillips curve (or there are short run Phillips curves). Although there are fewer possible actions available for the monetary policy to conceit people in order to increase the labour supply, unexpected changes can always trigger real changes. But what is the ultimate purpose of the central bank when changing the money supply? For example, and mostly: exerting countercyclical control. Doing so, monetary policy would increase the money supply in order to eliminate the negative effects of an unfavourable macroeconomic shock. However, monetary policy is not able to utilize the trade-off between inflation and real economic performance, because there is no information available in advance about the shocks to eliminate. Under these conditions, the central bank is unable to plan a course of action, that is, a countercyclical monetary policy. Rational agents can be conceited only by unexpected changes, so a well-known economic policy is completely in vain. However, and this is the point, the central bank cannot outline unforeseeable interventions in advance, because it has no informational advantage over the agents. The central bank has no information about what to eliminiate through countercyclical actions. The trade-off between inflation and unemployment exists, but it cannot be utilized by the monetary policy for countercyclical purposes.

The New Keynesian research program in particular emphasizes models in which money is not neutral in the short run, and therefore monetary policy can affect the real economy.

Post-Keynesian economics and monetary circuit theory reject the neutrality of money, instead emphasizing the role that bank lending and credit play in the creation of bank money. Post-Keynesians also emphasize the role that nominal debt plays: since the nominal amount of debt is not in general linked to inflation, inflation erodes the real value of nominal debt, and deflation increases it, causing real economic effects, as in debt-deflation.

The Austrian school of economics also rejects the theory of the neutrality of money, arguing that the money newly created by Central Banks (through the Open market operation system), or by primary banks (through Fractional-reserve banking system), is always given first to some specific branches of the economy, as in the construction segment, or agriculture, causing those segments that first receive money not to be affected by the price inflation (as the Austrian school also claims that printed and effectively distributed money (M1) causes price inflation).

== Reasons for departure from superneutrality ==
Even if money is neutral, so that the level of the money supply at any time has no influence on real magnitudes, money could still be non-superneutral: the growth rate of the money supply could affect real variables. A rise in the monetary growth rate, and the resulting rise in the inflation rate, lead to a decline in the real return on narrowly defined (zero-nominal-interest-bearing) money. Therefore, people choose to re-allocate their asset holdings away from money (that is, there is a decrease in real money demand) and into real assets such as goods inventories or even productive assets. The shift in money demand can affect the supply of loanable funds, and the combined changes in the nominal interest rate and the inflation rate may leave real interest rates changed from previously. If so, real expenditure on physical capital and durable consumer goods can be affected.

== See also ==
- Real versus nominal value (economics)
- Money illusion
- Veil of money
- Classical dichotomy
- Quantity theory of money
