= Money illusion =

Cognitive bias in economics

In economics, money illusion, or price illusion, is a cognitive bias where money is thought of in nominal, rather than real terms. In other words, the face value (nominal value) of money is mistaken for its purchasing power (real value) at a previous point in time. Viewing purchasing power as measured by the nominal value is false, as modern fiat currencies have no intrinsic value and their real value depends purely on the price level. The term was coined by Irving Fisher in Stabilizing the Dollar. It was popularized by John Maynard Keynes in the early twentieth century, and Irving Fisher wrote an important book on the subject, The Money Illusion, in 1928.

The existence of money illusion is disputed by monetary economists who contend that people act rationally (i.e. think in real prices) with regard to their wealth. Eldar Shafir, Peter A. Diamond, and Amos Tversky (1997) have provided empirical evidence for the existence of the effect and it has been shown to affect behaviour in a variety of experimental and real-world situations.

Shafir et al. also state that money illusion influences economic behaviour in three main ways:

- Price stickiness. Money illusion has been proposed as one reason why nominal prices are slow to change even where inflation has caused real prices to fall or costs to rise.
- Contracts and laws are not indexed to inflation as frequently as one would rationally expect.
- Social discourse, in formal media and more generally, reflects some confusion about real and nominal value.

Money illusion can also influence people's perceptions of outcomes. Experiments have shown that people generally perceive an approximate 2% cut in nominal income with no change in monetary value as unfair, but see a 2% rise in nominal income where there is 4% inflation as fair, despite them being almost rational equivalents. This result is consistent with the 'Myopic Loss Aversion theory'. Furthermore, the money illusion means nominal changes in price can influence demand even if real prices have remained constant.

== Explanations and implications ==
Explanations of money illusion generally describe the phenomenon in terms of heuristics. Nominal prices provide a convenient rule of thumb for determining value and real prices are only calculated if they seem highly salient (e.g. in periods of hyperinflation or in long term contracts).

Some have suggested that money illusion implies that the negative relationship between inflation and unemployment described by the Phillips curve might hold, contrary to more recent macroeconomic theories such as the "expectations-augmented Phillips curve". If workers use their nominal wage as a reference point when evaluating wage offers, firms can keep real wages relatively lower in a period of high inflation as workers accept the seemingly high nominal wage increase. These lower real wages would allow firms to hire more workers in periods of high inflation.

Money illusion is believed to be instrumental in the Friedmanian version of the Phillips curve. Actually, money illusion is not enough to explain the mechanism underlying this Phillips curve. It requires two additional assumptions. First, prices respond differently to modified demand conditions: an increased aggregate demand exerts its influence on commodity prices sooner than it does on labour market prices. Therefore, the drop in unemployment is, after all, the result of decreasing real wages and an accurate judgement of the situation by employees is the only reason for the return to an initial (natural) rate of unemployment (i.e. the end of the money illusion, when they finally recognize the actual dynamics of prices and wages). The other (arbitrary) assumption refers to a special informational asymmetry: whatever employees are unaware of in connection with the changes in (real and nominal) wages and prices can be clearly observed by employers. The new classical version of the Phillips curve was aimed at removing the puzzling additional presumptions, but its mechanism still requires money illusion.

== See also ==
- Behavioural economics
- Fiscal Illusion
- Framing (social science)
- Homo economicus
- Map-territory relation
