= Robert Lucas Jr. =

American economist and Nobel Laureate (1937–2023)

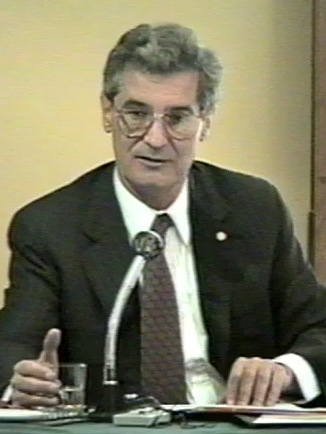
- Lucas in 1996
- Born: Robert Emerson Lucas Jr. September 15, 1937; Yakima, Washington, U.S.
- Died: May 15, 2023 (aged 85); Chicago, Illinois, U.S.
- Spouses: Rita Cohen (m. 1959, divorced); Nancy Stokey
- Children: 2

Academic background
- Education: University of Chicago (BA, PhD)
- Doctoral advisor: H. Gregg Lewis; Dale W. Jorgenson

Academic work
- Discipline: Macroeconomics
- School or tradition: New classical macroeconomics
- Institutions: Carnegie Mellon University; University of Chicago
- Doctoral students: Marcel Boyer; Costas Azariadis; Jean-Pierre Danthine; Boyan Jovanovic; Paul Romer; Esteban Rossi-Hansberg; Benjamin Moll
- Notable ideas: Rational expectations; Lucas critique
- Awards: Nobel Memorial Prize in Economic Sciences (1995)
- Website: Information at IDEAS / RePEc

Robert Emerson Lucas Jr. (September 15, 1937 – May 15, 2023) was an American economist at the University of Chicago. Widely regarded as the central figure in the development of the new classical approach to macroeconomics, he received the Nobel Memorial Prize in Economic Sciences in 1995 "for having developed and applied the hypothesis of rational expectations, and thereby having transformed macroeconomic analysis and deepened our understanding of economic policy". N. Gregory Mankiw characterized him as "the most influential macroeconomist of the last quarter of the 20th century". In 2020, he ranked as the 10th most cited economist in the world.

== Early life and education ==
Lucas was born on September 15, 1937, in Yakima, Washington, as the eldest child of Robert Emerson Lucas and Jane Templeton Lucas. His parents ran an ice creamery in Yakima. After the business failed during the Great Depression, the family moved to Seattle. His mother worked as a fashion designer and his father worked at a shipbuilding yard and later worked as a welder with a refrigeration company.

Lucas received his BA in history in 1959 from the University of Chicago. Lucas attended the University of California, Berkeley, as a first-year graduate student, but he left Berkeley due to financial reasons and returned to Chicago in 1960, where he earned a PhD in economics in 1964. His dissertation, Substitution Between Labor and Capital in U.S. Manufacturing: 1929–1958, was written under the supervision of H. Gregg Lewis and Dale Jorgenson. Lucas studied economics for his PhD on "quasi-Marxist" grounds. He believed that economics was the true driver of history, and so he planned to immerse himself fully in economics and then return to the history department.

== Career ==
Following his graduation, Lucas taught at the Graduate School of Industrial Administration (now Tepper School of Business) at Carnegie Mellon University until 1975, when he returned to the University of Chicago.

Lucas was elected to the American Academy of Arts and Sciences in 1980, a Guggenheim Fellowship and the National Academy of Sciences in 1981, and the American Philosophical Society in 1997. A collection of his papers is housed at the Rubenstein Library at Duke University.

Lucas was awarded the Nobel Memorial Prize in Economic Sciences in 1995. The citation noted that the prize was "for having developed and applied the hypothesis of rational expectations, and thereby having transformed macroeconomic analysis and deepened our understanding of economic policy".

== Research contributions ==
=== Rational expectations ===
Lucas is well known for his investigations into the implications of rational expectations in macroeconomic theory. John Muth had published "Rational Expectations and the Theory of Price Movements" in 1961 at the same faculty in Carnegie Tech. Lucas (1972) incorporated the idea of rational expectations into a dynamic macroeconomic models. The agents in Lucas's model are rational: based on the available information, they form expectations about future prices and quantities, and based on these expectations they act to maximize their expected lifetime utility. He also provided sound theoretical foundations to Milton Friedman and Edmund Phelps's view of the long-run neutrality of money, and provided an explanation for the then observed correlation between output and inflation, depicted by the Phillips curve, while illustrating that the existence of this empirical relationship did not yield a possibility of a policy trade off.

=== Lucas critique ===
In 1976, Lucas challenged the foundations of macroeconomic theory (previously dominated by the Keynesian economics approach), arguing that a macroeconomic model should be built as an aggregated version of microeconomic models while noting that aggregation in the theoretical sense may not be possible within a given model. He formulated the "Lucas critique" of economic policymaking, which holds that relationships that appear to hold in the economy, such as an apparent relationship between inflation and unemployment, could change in response to changes in economic policy. The reformulation influenced the development of new classical macroeconomics and the drive towards microeconomic foundations for macroeconomic theory.

=== Other contributions ===
Lucas developed a theory of supply that suggests people can be tricked by unsystematic monetary policy; the Uzawa–Lucas model (with Hirofumi Uzawa) of human capital accumulation; and the "Lucas paradox", which considers why more capital does not flow from developed countries to developing countries. Lucas (1988) is a seminal contribution in the economic development and growth literature. Lucas and Paul Romer heralded the birth of endogenous growth theory and the resurgence of research on economic growth in the late 1980s and the 1990s.

Lucas also contributed foundational contributions to behavioral economics, and provided the intellectual foundation for the understanding of deviations from the law of one price based on the irrationality of investors.

In 2003, he stated, about five years before the Great Recession, that the "central problem of depression-prevention has been solved, for all practical purposes, and has in fact been solved for many decades."

Lucas also proposed the Lucas Wedge which tries to show how much higher GDP would be in the presence of proper policy.

== Personal life ==
Lucas married an undergraduate classmate from the University of Chicago, Rita Cohen. The couple had two sons, Stephen (born 1960) and Joseph (born 1966).

Lucas and Cohen divorced in the 1980s. The divorce stipulation had a clause that entitled Cohen to half of his Nobel prize winnings if the prize were to be awarded before October 31, 1995, which ended up being the case.

After his painful divorce from Cohen, Lucas married Nancy Stokey. The couple collaborated on papers on growth theory, public finance, and monetary theory.

Lucas died in Chicago on May 15, 2023, at the age of 85.

== Bibliography ==
- Lucas, Robert (1972). "Expectations and the Neutrality of Money". Journal of Economic Theory. 4 (2): 103–24. doi:10.1016/0022-0531(72)90142-1.
- Lucas, Robert (1976). "Econometric Policy Evaluation: A Critique". Carnegie-Rochester Conference Series on Public Policy. 1: 19–46. doi:10.1016/S0167-2231(76)80003-6.
- Lucas, Robert (1988). "On the Mechanics of Economic Development". Journal of Monetary Economics. 22 (1): 3–42. doi:10.1016/0304-3932(88)90168-7. S2CID 154875771. SSRN 227120.
- Lucas, Robert (1990). "Why Doesn't Capital Flow from Rich to Poor Countries". American Economic Review. 80 (2): 92–96. JSTOR 2006549.
- Lucas, Robert (1981). Studies in Business-Cycle Theory. MIT Press. ISBN 978-0-262-62044-4.
- Lucas, Robert (1995). "Monetary Neutrality". Prize Lecture, 1995 Nobel Prize in Economics, December 7, 1995,
- Stokey, Nancy; Robert Lucas; and Edward Prescott (1989), Recursive Methods in Economic Dynamics, Harvard University Press, ISBN 0674750969.
- Lucas, Robert E. Jr. (2012). "The History and Future of Economic Growth". In Miniter, Brendan (ed.). The 4% Solution: Unleashing the Economic Growth America Needs. New York: Crown Business. pp. 27–41. ISBN 978-0-307-98614-6.
- Lucas, Robert E. Jr.; Moll, Benjamin (October 2011). "Knowledge Growth and the Allocation of Time". Working Paper Series no. 17495. National Bureau of Economic Research. doi:10.3386/w17495.
  - Lucas, Robert E. Jr.; Moll, Benjamin (February 2014). "Knowledge Growth and the Allocation of Time". Journal of Political Economy. 122 (1): 1–51. doi:10.1086/674363. S2CID 6319313.

== See also ==
- List of economists
- Lucas critique
- Lucas islands model
- Lucas wedge
- Uzawa–Lucas model
- Welfare cost of business cycles

== Notes ==
Awards
Preceded by John C. Harsanyi; John F. Nash Jr. Reinhard Selten	Laureate of the Nobel Memorial Prize in Economics; 1995	Succeeded by James A. Mirrlees; William Vickrey
Academic offices
Preceded by Roger Guesnerie	President of the Econometric Society; 1997	Succeeded by Jean Tirole
Preceded by Sherwin Rosen	President of the American Economic Association; 2002–2003	Succeeded by Peter Diamond
