= Carnegie School =

School of economic thought

The Carnegie School is a school of economic thought originally formed at the Graduate School of Industrial Administration (GSIA), the current Tepper School of Business, of Carnegie Institute of Technology, the current Carnegie Mellon University, especially during the 1950s to 1970s.

The Carnegie School is notable for its interdisciplinary approach, integrating insights from economics, psychology, management science, computer science, public policy, statistics, social sciences, and decision sciences. Faculty and students from these diverse fields collaborated closely, fostering innovative research at the intersection of business, technology, and the social sciences.

Faculty at the Graduate School of Industrial Administration are known for formulating two "seemingly incompatible" concepts: bounded rationality and rational expectations. Bounded rationality was developed by Herbert A. Simon, along with James March, Richard Cyert and Oliver Williamson. Rational expectations were developed by John F. Muth and later translated into macroeconomic theory by Robert Lucas Jr., Thomas Sargent, Leonard Rapping, and others.

Depending on author and context, the term "Carnegie School" can refer to either both branches or only the bounded rationality branch, sometimes with the qualifier Carnegie School of organization theory. The commonality between both branches is the use of dynamic optimization and forecasting techniques derived from production theory and expectations, and the early use of computers to solve planning and optimization problems. Along with other, mostly Midwestern universities, the rational expectations branch is considered part of freshwater economics, while the bounded rationality branch has been credited with originating behavioral economics and economics of organization.

== History ==
The Graduate School of Industrial Administration (GSIA) at the Carnegie Institute of Technology (CIT) in Pittsburgh, Pennsylvania was founded in the late 1940s, after receiving a grant by William Larimer Mellon Sr. to enable graduate instruction in business and economics for the engineers the CIT already produced. This superseded an initial attempt to "restart" the economics department, which had lapsed during World War II. The founding dean was George Leland Bach, initial faculty hires included William W. Cooper and Herbert A. Simon. Other early appointees were Abraham Charnes, Richard Cyert, James G. March, Franco Modigliani and Merton Miller.

GSIA was set up as a "new look" business school, moving beyond the case-based method of instruction popularized by Harvard Business School, to incorporate scientific methods of management. The economics faculty was folded into the business school.

In 1956, Carnegie Tech obtained an IBM 650 computer, jointly acquired by GSIA and the engineering and mathematics departments, but housed in the basement of the business school. Along with the computer, Allen Newell and Alan Perlis joined the faculty, with Perlis being put in charge of the computing facilities. Edward Feigenbaum, at the time a student at Carnegie Tech, was sufficiently intrigued to transfer to GSIA. All three, along with Herb Simon, would later receive the Turing Award for their contributions to computer science.

== Scope ==
The focus of the research was on organizational behavior and the application of decision analysis, management science, and psychology as well as theories such as bounded rationality to the understanding of the organization and the firm.

"The astonishing thing about Carnegie is that it joined two fundamental and seemingly incompatible strands of research. One dealt with bounded rationality, organization theory, and behavioral economics. The leading members of that group were Herbert Simon, Richard Cyert, and James March. The second strand dealt with rational expectations and efficient markets. Members of that group include Franco Modigliani (…), John Muth, Merton Miller, and Allan Meltzer, to be joined later by Robert Lucas (…), Thomas Sargent (…), and Edward Prescott." — Oliver Williamson

The interdisciplinary environment at GSIA, while extraordinarily productive, also contained inherent tensions. As Oliver Williamson later reflected on his experience as a graduate student in the early 1960s, "Carnegie was the place to be" for cutting-edge interdisciplinary research, though "orchestrating cutting-edge interdisciplinary research and teaching are never easy." The methodological diversity that enabled breakthrough innovations would eventually prove difficult to sustain as academic disciplines matured and developed more rigid theoretical commitments during the 1960s and 1970s.

== People ==
“Carnegie Tech was an amazing place at the time. New ideas of all kinds were in the air. They were not always consistent with each other, as in the case of the conflict between John Muth’s suggestion about how to model expectations as “rational” and [Herbert] Simon’s notion of “bounded rationality.” We students benefited from the lively debates among the faculty. We were also encouraged by the faculty to get involved in the research process even before we had mastered the details of the literature. In my last two years, I took courses from Robert Lucas and Oliver Williamson with fellow student Ed Prescott, all of whom are now Laureates. In retrospect, it was obviously a very special educational experience.” – Dale Mortensen Nobel biographical (2010).

GSIA faculty with notable contributions to their field included later Nobel Laureates in Economic Sciences Herbert A. Simon (1978), Franco Modigliani (1985), Merton Miller (1990), Robert Lucas Jr (1995), Edward C. Prescott & Finn E. Kydland (jointly 2004), and Lars Peter Hansen (2013). In addition, later Nobel Laureates Oliver Williamson (2009) and Dale Mortensen (2010) attended GSIA as Ph.D. students. John F. Muth, while heavily favored to receive the Prize for his pioneering work on rational expectations, was not included in 1995 or any other year thereafter.

The organizational branch included James G. March along with later GSIA dean and university president Richard Cyert and graduate students Oliver Williamson, William Starbuck and Victor Vroom.

A number of later Turing Award recipients also had their roots at GSIA, before the Carnegie Mellon School of Computer Science was founded in 1968. These include Alan Perlis (1966, the inaugural recipient), Allen Newell & Herbert A. Simon (jointly 1975), and Edward Feigenbaum (1994, jointly with Raj Reddy).

The interdisciplinary approach featured faculty at Carnegie Mellon's modern departments of economics, business, computer science, design, public policy, psychology, statistics and data science, and social and decision sciences.

Herbert Simon (1988) and his frequent collaborators Abraham Charnes and William Cooper (both 1982, jointly with Carnegie physicist Richard J. Duffin) also received the John von Neumann Theory Prize for their pioneering contributions to operations research and management science. Statistician Carlton E. Lemke (1978, jointly with John Forbes Nash Jr., a Carnegie undergraduate), who wrote his dissertation at GSIA under Abraham Charnes, preceded all four.

=== Faculty Dispersal ===
Beginning in the early 1960s, GSIA experienced a systematic exodus of some of its most distinguished faculty to other institutions. Franco Modigliani departed for Northwestern University and later MIT. James G. March departed for Stanford University in 1964 to build an organizational behavior program more aligned with behavioral research approaches. Merton Miller left for the University of Chicago in 1961, drawn by that institution's commitment to rational choice theory and mathematical economics. Robert Lucas Jr. subsequently moved to Chicago in 1974, where he further developed rational expectations macroeconomics.

This migration pattern reflected systematic sorting based on methodological compatibility rather than mere career opportunism. As academic disciplines professionalizing during the 1960s, economics departments at other major universities increasingly embraced mathematical formalization and rational choice assumptions, creating natural destinations for top scholars. Simultaneously, emerging organizational behavior programs provided institutional support for behavioral and psychological approaches to management research. The methodological pluralism that had enabled GSIA's innovations became increasingly difficult to sustain within a single institution.

The dispersal ultimately benefited other institutions significantly. The University of Chicago became the leading center for rational expectations theory and efficient markets research, while Stanford University emerged as the premier institution for organizational behavior and behavioral economics. MIT's Sloan School adapted GSIA's quantitative approaches to management science, and Northwestern University's Kellogg School of Management established its Managerial Economics and Decision Sciences program with former GSIA faculty.

=== Notable members of the Carnegie School ===
==== Founders ====
- George Leland Bach (PhD University of Chicago 1940, economics) was the founding dean of GSIA when he was tasked in 1946 to restart economics education at Carnegie. He left in 1962 for Stanford University, with the brief to make Stanford’s business school look more like GSIA.
- William W. Cooper (PhD unfinished Columbia University 1942, business) joined Bach from Chicago as the second faculty on the yet-to-founded new business school in 1946. Considered one of the founders of Management Science, jointly with his long-time collaborator Charnes. Became dean of the new School of Urban and Public Affairs in 1969, leaving Carnegie in 1975 for Harvard and later Texas. Herb Simon’s college dormmate.
- Herbert A. Simon (PhD University of Chicago 1943, political science) joined the inaugural team of academics at GSIA in 1949, initially as the director of undergraduate programs. Stayed at Carnegie until his death in 2001, but left GSIA in 1970 for a joint psychology and computer science appointment. Received the Turing Award in 1975, jointly with Alan Newell, and the Economics Nobel Prize in 1978.

==== Organization theorists ====
- Richard M. Cyert (PhD Columbia University 1948, economics) joined Carnegie in 1948, became Dean of GSIA in 1962 and president of Carnegie Mellon in 1972. Retired in 1990.
- James G. March (PhD Yale University 1953, political science) joined Carnegie in 1953 out of graduate school, left in 1964 first for University of California, Irvine, then for Stanford University to help found the California tradition of organizational science.
- Oliver E. Williamson (PhD Carnegie 1963, economics) wrote his dissertation under Cyert on managerial slack, left in 1963 for UC Berkeley and later Wharton, received the 2009 economics Nobel Prize (shared with Elinor Ostrom) for pioneering transaction cost economics.
- Edwin Mansfield (PhD Duke 1955, economics) joined GSIA as a junior faculty and developed the research on diffusion of innovation that would later make him famous. Left for Penn in 1964.

==== Finance and macroeconomists ====
- Franco Modigliani (PhD New School for Social Research 1944, economics) at GSIA from 1952 to 1962, famous for the life-cycle hypothesis and two papers jointly with Merton Miller on the irrelevance of debt-equity ratios and dividend decisions. Left for MIT via Northwestern University, won the Economics Nobel Prize in 1985.
- Merton Miller (PhD Johns Hopkins 1952, economics) at GSIA from 1952 to 1961. Worked with Franco Modigliani on "Mo-MI" and "Mi-Mo". Left for Chicago in 1961. Nobel Laureate 1990.
- Robert Lucas Jr. (PhD Chicago 1964, economics) at GSIA from 1963 to 1975, famous for introducing John Muth's Rational Expectations to macroeconomics and formulating the Lucas Critique. Economics Nobel Laureate 1995.
- Leonard Rapping (PhD Chicago 1961, economics) At GSIA from 1962 to 1973. Left for University of Massachusetts Amherst. Worked with Lucas on "Real Wages, Employment, and Inflation".

==== Operations researchers and industrial engineers ====
- Abraham Charnes (PhD University of Illinois 1947, mathematics) became a member of the GSIA founding team upon graduation in 1948. Joining up mostly with Cooper, they applied linear optimization to production and operations problems, somewhat apart from the Simon group. Left in 1955 for Purdue University, Northwestern University, and ultimately settled at University of Texas in 1968.
- John F. Muth (PhD Carnegie 1962, mathematical economics), considered the “father of the rational expectations movement”, at Carnegie from 1956-64 initially as a student, from 1959 as a professor, left for Michigan State University and later Indiana University after not having been offered tenure.
- Charles C. Holt (PhD University of Chicago 1955, economics) joined GSIA in 1956 from M.I.T., became the forecast expert in the HMMS team, known for his exponential smoothing method developed with graduate student Peter R. Winters. Left for the University of Wisconsin in 1961.
- Charles P. Bonini (PhD Carnegie 1962, industrial engineering) at Carnegie as a graduate student from 1955 to 1959, joined Stanford University as junior faculty and immediately convinced Oliver Williamson to move in the other direction.

== Publications ==
Highly influential books published by researchers of the Carnegie School include, in chronological order:

- Administrative Behavior (1947) by Herbert A. Simon.
- An Introduction to Linear Programming (1953) by Abraham Charnes, William W. Cooper & Alexander Henderson.
- Models of Man (1957) by Herbert A. Simon.
- Organizations (1959) by James G. March and Herbert A. Simon.
- Planning Production, Inventory and Work Force (1960) by Charles A. Holt, Franco Modigliani, John F. Muth, and Herbert A. Simon.
- Management Models and Industrial Applications of Linear Programming (1961) by Abraham Charnes and William W. Cooper.
- Statistical Sampling for Accounting Information (1962) by Richard M. Cyert and H. Justin Davidson.
- A Behavioral Theory of the Firm (1963) by Richard M. Cyert and James G. March.
- The Relative Stability of Monetary Velocity and the Investment Multiplier (1964) by Abert K. Ando and Franco Modigliani.
- The Carnegie Tech Management Game (1964) by Kalman J. Cohen, William R. Dill, Alfred A. Kuehn and Peter R. Winters
- Theory of the Firm: Resource Allocation in a Market Economy (1965) by Kalman J. Cohen and Richard M. Cyert.
- The Sciences of the Artificial (1969) by Herbert A. Simon.
- Human Problem Solving (1972) by Allen Newell and Herbert A. Simon.
- Bayesian Analysis and Uncertainty in Economic Theory (1987) by Richard M. Cyert and Morris H. DeGroot.
- Models of Business Cycles (1987) by Robert E. Lucas, jr.
- Decisions and Organizations (1989) by James G. March.

The computational model developed for A Behavioral Theory of the Firm represented a pioneering achievement in organizational research, being arguably the first computational model to instantiate organizational constructs within a substantial theoretical framework. The model embodied innovative representations of organizational attention, organizational learning, organizational memory, routines, and aspiration level adjustments.

In addition to the books, a number of articles authored or co-authored by members of the Carnegie school became foundational within their fields.

- "A Linear Decision Rule for Production and Employment Scheduling" (1955) by Charles C. Holt, Franco Modigliani, and Herbert A. Simon, Management Science.
- "Dynamic Programming Under Uncertainty with a Quadratic Criterion Function" (1956) by Herbert A. Simon, Econometrica.
- "Forecasting Seasonals and Trends by Exponentially Weighted Moving Averages" (1957) by Charles C. Holt, Office of Naval Research Report #52 , reprint (2004) International Journal of Forecasting.
- "Derivation of a Linear Decision Rule for Production and Employment" (1958) by Charles C. Holt, Franco Modigliani, and John F. Muth, Management Science.
- "The Cost of Capital, Corporation Finance and the Theory of Investment" (1958) by Franco Modigliani and Merton H. Miller, American Economic Review.
- "Forecasting Sales by Exponentially Weighted Moving Averages" (1960) by Peter R. Winters, Management Science.
- "Rational Expectations and the Theory of Price Movements" (1961) by John F. Muth, Econometrica.
