= Administrative Behavior =

Book by Herbert Simon

Administrative Behavior: a Study of Decision-Making Processes in Administrative Organization
- Title page of first edition
- Author: Herbert A. Simon
- Language: English
- Publisher: Macmillan
- Publication date: 1947
- Publication place: United States
- Media type: Print (hardcover)
- Pages: xvi + 259
- OCLC: 356505
- LC Class: HD31 .S55

Administrative Behavior: a Study of Decision-Making Processes in Administrative Organization is a book written by Herbert A. Simon (1916–2001). It asserts that "decision-making is the heart of administration, and that the vocabulary of administrative theory must be derived from the logic and psychology of human choice", and it attempts to describe administrative organizations "in a way that will provide the basis for scientific analysis". The first edition was published in 1947; the second, in 1957; the third, in 1976; and the fourth, in 1997. As summarized in a 2001 obituary of Simon, the book "reject[ed] the notion of an omniscient 'economic man' capable of making decisions that bring the greatest benefit possible and substitut[ed] instead the idea of 'administrative man' who 'satisfices—looks for a course of action that is satisfactory'". Administrative Behavior laid the foundation for the economic movement known as the Carnegie School.

The book crosses social science disciplines such as political science and economics. Simon returned to some of the ideas in the book in his later works, such as The Sciences of the Artificial (1969). The Royal Swedish Academy of Sciences cited the book as "epoch-making" in awarding the 1978 Nobel Memorial Prize in Economic Sciences to Simon. A 1990 article in Public Administration Review named it the "public administration book of the half century" (1940-1990). It was voted the fifth most influential management book of the 20th century in a poll of the Fellows of the Academy of Management.

== Background ==
The book is based on Simon's doctoral thesis in political science at the University of Chicago, which he began planning in 1937. At the time, the chair of the political science department was Charles Edward Merriam.

Beginning in 1936, Simon worked as a half-time research assistant and then as a full-time staff member at the International City Managers Association (ICMA). Among other activities at ICMA, he learned about administration and about scientific collaboration from director Clarence Ridley, and published his first book with Ridley in 1938. Although Simon cites Ridley as a major influence on his thinking, Simon did not actually work on his thesis while at ICMA.

Simon took a position at the Bureau of Public Administration at the University of California, Berkeley between 1939 and 1942. It was at Berkeley that he completed his University of Chicago Ph.D. thesis, which was approved by a committee consisting of Leonard D. White, C. Herman Pritchett, Clarence Ridley, and Charner Marquis Perry. Simon received his doctorate in 1942.

== Influences ==
In writing his thesis and book, Simon was influenced by The Functions of the Executive (1938) by Chester I. Barnard. In his 1991 autobiography, Simon wrote that he found Barnard's book "wholly superior to the other administrative literature of the day and fully compatible with my preference for looking at management in decision-making terms". The book, which Simon read "with painstaking care", motivated Simon to reflect upon his experiences and to focus on administrative decision making. In a 1988 interview, Simon was quoted as follows:

Of course I built squarely on Barnard, and have always felt deeply indebted to him; science is a cumulative endeavor...In the book itself there are fourteen references to Barnard...the notions of the contribution-inducement equilibrium, authority, and zone of acceptance were all derived from Barnard...What I would now regard as the principal novelties in Administrative Behavior are the development of the concept of organizational identification...the description of the decision process in terms of the processing of decision premises, and the bounded rationality notions...Most of the rest is highly "Barnardian", and certainly even those "novel" ideas are in no way inconsistent with Barnard's view of organizations.

Mitchell and Scott have noted similarities in Barnard's and Simon's concepts of authority, organizational equilibrium, and decision making. For example, Barnard's "zone of indifference" (a subordinate's unquestioned acceptance of authority) became Simon's "zone of acceptance". In addition, Mitchell and Scott concluded that both Simon and Barnard believed that large organizations control individuals' behavior and manipulate their opinions.

Philosophers who influenced Simon include William James, John Dewey, A. J. Ayer, and Rudolf Carnap. The ideas of behavioral psychologist Edward C. Tolman and sociologist Talcott Parsons also contributed to Simon's work. Simon characterized his own philosophical approach as logical positivism.

== Editions ==
=== Preliminary (1945) ===
In 1945, when Simon was at the Illinois Institute of Technology, he sent mimeographed copies of a preliminary version of the book (which was similar to his thesis) to about 200 people he thought might be interested in his work. One of the recipients of the preliminary version was Barnard. Although Simon did not know Barnard personally, Barnard sent a total of 25 pages of detailed comments to Simon, which resulted in a thorough revision of the book. Simon then asked Barnard to write the book's foreword.

=== 1st (1947) ===
The first edition had 16 pages of front matter (e.g., a foreword by Chester Barnard, a preface, and acknowledgements), as well as 259 pages of body matter (i.e., Chapters I-XI) and back matter (appendix and index).

The published first edition was different from the preliminary version in many ways, including:

- Mathematical appendices and a comparison of rats and humans in organizations was removed
- The chapters were rearranged, with "Some Problems of Administrative Theory" moved up to Chapter II
- Some discussion of logical positivism was deleted
- There was more discussion of communication within organizations
- Material that could be considered "political" (e.g., passages that appeared to support New Deal economics) had been taken out

In the foreword, Barnard states that Simon's conclusions are "consonant with [his] experience" as an executive, and expresses hope that "ultimately it may be possible to state principles of general organization". In the Acknowledgements, Simon thanked Barnard for The Functions of the Executive, for "the extremely careful critical review he gave the preliminary version of this book", and for his foreword.

=== 2nd (1957) ===
The second edition featured a new Introduction, causing the book to contain 48 pages of front matter and 259 pages of body and back matter. The Introduction summarized the book's structure, suggested how practitioners might apply the book's lessons, discussed the concepts of rational behavior and satisficing, commented on specific chapters in the book, and provided recent references.

=== 3rd (1976) ===
The third edition, which had 50 pages of front matter and 364 pages of body and back matter, placed the original Chapters I-XI and Appendix into a Part I. Its "Part II" consisted of six new chapters (XII through XVII) based on articles that Simon had written:

- XII: "On the Concept of Organizational Goal" (pages 257-278), originally published in 1964
- XIII: "The Future of Information-Processing Technology" (pages 279-287), originally published in 1968
- XIV: "Applying Information Technology to Organization Design" (pages 288-308), originally published in 1973
- XV: "Selective Perception: the Identifications of Executives (with DeWitt C. Dearborn)" (pages 309-314), originally published in 1958
- XVI: "The Birth of an Organization" (pages 315-324), originally published in 1953
- XVII: "The Business School: a Problem in Organizational Design" (pages 335-356), originally published in 1967

=== 4th (1997) ===
Cover of 4th edition (1997); note change of subtitle to "...Organizations"

For the fourth edition, with 15 pages of front matter and 368 pages of body and back matter, the last word in the subtitle was changed from "Organization" to "Organizations". The fourth edition lacked Barnard's foreword which had been present in the first through third editions. Instead of the third edition's lengthy Introduction and Part II, in the fourth edition the Introduction was briefer and Simon's commentaries followed each chapter of the original text.

== Summary ==
The text and pagination of the 253 pages of Chapters I-XI and of the Appendix ("What Is an Administrative Science?") were the same in the 1st, 2nd, and 3rd editions. Although the text of Chapters I-XI and the Appendix was the same in the 4th edition, the pagination was different.

=== Chapter I. Decision-Making and Administrative Organization ===
This chapter was based on a 1944 article with the same name in Public Administration Review. Simon distinguishes between "value judgments" (which "lead toward the selection of final goals") and "factual judgments" (which "involve the implementation of such goals"), a topic which he explores more fully in Chapter III. The relationship of the individual and the group in decision-making is explored; for example, influences upon individuals include authority, organizational loyalty, efficiency, advice and information, and training.

=== Chapter II. Some Problems of Administrative Theory ===
Based on a 1946 article in Public Administration Review entitled "The Proverbs of Administration", Chapter II is notable for the following passage near its beginning:

It is a fatal defect of the current principles of administration that, like proverbs, they occur in pairs. For almost every principle one can find an equally plausible and acceptable contradictory principle. Although the two principles of the pair will lead to exactly opposite organizational recommendations, there is nothing in the theory to indicate which is the proper one to apply. To substantiate this criticism, it is necessary to examine briefly some of the leading principles.

1. Administrative efficiency is increased by a specialization of the task among the group
2. Administrative efficiency is increased by arranging the members of the group in a determinate hierarchy of authority
3. Administrative efficiency is increased by limiting the span of control at any point in the hierarchy to a small number
4. Administrative efficiency is increased by grouping the workers

These principles were found in the 1937 book Papers on the Science of Administration edited by Luther Gulick and Lyndall Urwick. After pointing out the shortcomings in the four principles, such as ambiguities and lack of empirical evidence, Simon states that "over-all efficiency must be the guiding criterion" in administrative organizations and that scientific methods must be applied to determine how to improve that efficiency.

=== Chapter III. Fact and Value in Decision-Making ===
Chapter III "clarifies foundational aspects of the logic of choice." The first section of the chapter provides details for the explanation in Chapter I of "facts" versus "values". The chapter's second section on "Policy and Administration" discusses how the legislative and executive branches of government apply facts and values.

=== Chapter IV. Rationality in Administrative Behavior ===
After considering how the ideas of means and ends relate to decision-making, Simon distinguishes among "objectively", "subjectively", "consciously", "deliberately", "organizationally", and "personally" rational decisions.

=== Chapter V. The Psychology of Administrative Decisions ===
In the first part of this chapter, "The Limits of Rationality", Simon wrote:

Actual behavior falls short, in at least three ways, of objective rationality…:

(1) Rationality requires a complete knowledge and anticipation of the consequences that will follow on each choice. In fact, knowledge of consequences is always fragmentary.
(2) Since these consequences lie in the future, imagination must supply the lack of experienced feeling in attaching value to them. But values can be only imperfectly anticipated.
(3) Rationality requires a choice among all possible alternative behaviors. In actual behavior, only a very few of all these possible alternatives ever come to mind.

The remainder of the chapter concerns "Purposive Behavior in the Individual" and "The Integration of Behavior".

=== Chapter VI. The Equilibrium of the Organization ===
As summarized by Simon in the 4th edition's "Commentary on Chapter VI", the central idea of this chapter is that "the survival and success of organizations depend on their providing sufficient incentives to their members to secure the contributions that are needed to carry out the organizations' tasks".

=== Chapter VII. The Role of Authority ===
Chapters VII-X deal with four ways in which an organization can influence an individual's decisions: authority, communication, criterion of efficiency, and loyalties and organizational identification.

In Chapter VII, Simon discusses the nature of authority and how it is used in organizations: enforcing responsibility, obtaining decision-making expertise, and coordinating activity. Four methods are described for avoiding conflicts in authority when a subordinate has multiple superiors.

=== Chapter VIII. Communication ===
Simon defines communication as "any process whereby decisional premises are transmitted from one member of an organization to another". Communication can be formal or informal, may need to be archived to provide "memory" for an organization, and is sometimes accomplished through training. The 4th edition's "Commentary on Chapter VIII" discusses computerized communications which were unavailable in 1947.

=== Chapter IX. The Criterion of Efficiency ===
This chapter expands upon a concept that had been mentioned briefly in preceding chapters. In a for-profit organization, the "criterion of efficiency" states than an individual will select an alternative that will maximize income and minimize cost so as to "yield the greatest net (money) return to the organization". More generally (i.e., to include nonprofit organizations) the criterion causes "that choice of alternatives which produces the largest result for the given application of resources." In the remainder of the chapter, Simon counters criticisms of the efficiency criterion and outlines methods by which efficiency can be attained (e.g., by "functionalization" and by the public budgeting process).

=== Chapter X. Loyalties and Organizational Identification ===
Following a concept of Harold Lasswell, Simon asserts that "a person identifies himself with a group when, in making a decision, he evaluates the several alternatives of choice in terms of their consequences for the specified group." Such organizational identification can be associated with decisions that are not optimal in terms of an organization's efficiency or adequacy ("the degree to which its goals have been reached").

=== Chapter XI. The Anatomy of Organization ===
Simon describes the organizational decision-making process and writes:

The need for an administrative theory resides in the fact that there are practical limits to human rationality, and that these limits are not static, but depend upon the organizational environment in which the individual's decision takes place. The task of administration is so to design this environment that the individual will approach as close as practicable to rationality (judged in terms of the organization's goals) in his decisions.

=== Appendix: What Is an Administrative Science? ===
In the final part of the book common to all editions, Simon discusses the "theoretical" (descriptive) aspects and "practical" aspects (i.e., leading toward the improved attainment of objectives) of the science of administration.

== Criticism ==
- Robert A. Dahl wrote in 1947 that a science of organizations was impossible due to cultural differences among organizations. Similarly, a 1957 review of the second edition questioned whether scientific studies of important aspects of organizational decision-making "under controlled conditions" could ever be undertaken. Simon responded to the 1957 review that "as knowledge advances...administrative practice will come to rest largely on scientifically tested knowledge of fundamental underlying mechanisms".
- The book played a central role in what is known as the "Simon-Waldo debate" published in the American Political Science Review in 1952. Using "purple prose", Simon and Dwight Waldo exchanged articles in which Simon "accuse[d] Waldo of logical unrigor" while Waldo "charge[d] Simon with philosophical myopia" due to Simon's reliance on logical positivism in Administrative Behavior.
- In 1962 Herbert Storing edited a book entitled Essays on the Scientific Study of Politics; one of the essays therein, by Storing himself, critiqued Administrative Behavior. In his autobiography, Simon wrote that the essays in Storing's book "were such egregious examples of the practice of reading texts unsympathetically and without a genuine attempt to understand them that [he] never felt an urge to respond to them". One analysis notes differences in Storing's and Simon's styles of thinking ("dichotomous" versus "synthetic"), levels of abstraction, and "assumed 'goodness' of organizations".
- Simon does not offer any convincing replacement for the principles of organization that he critiques.
- Simon's introductions and commentaries in the second through fourth editions interpret material in the first edition in a way that stretches its meaning or contradicts it. For example, Simon saw "satisficing man" in the 1947 text but other authors saw "maximizing man".
- The fact/value and policy/administration distinctions have been criticized as unnecessary.
- The book minimizes the role of emotions and habit in organizations.
- Simon did not analyze how immoral behavior, such as police corruption, can occur within organizations.
- A 1990 essay asserts that Chapter II ("Some Problems of Administrative Theory") did not criticize Gulick's work fairly in that Gulick already recognized most of the problems that Simon discussed.

== Legacy ==
Simon felt that the reviews of the first edition "were generally kind, but the reviewers were not exhilerated [sic]", and that the book "created no sensation" at first. Nevertheless, it became notable for the following innovations:

- A scientific approach to administration.
- A focus on organizational decision making as the basis for organizational action, as opposed to John Dewey who emphasized habit and action.
- The initial description of what would later be called "bounded rationality," a term that one paper concludes first appeared in Simon's 1957 book Models of Man, In the 1st edition of Administrative Behavior, Simon used the phrases "limits to rationality" or "limits of rationality."
- The initial description of what a 1956 paper by Simon called satisficing. As stated in the Introductions to the 2nd and 3rd editions, and in the 4th edition's "Commentary on Chapter V":

The central concern of administrative theory is with the boundary between the rational and the nonrational aspects of human social behavior. Administrative theory is peculiarly the theory of intended and bounded rationality – of the behavior of human beings who satisfice because they have not the wits to maximize.

Later in the 2nd through 4th editions, "to satisfice" is defined as "to look[] for a course of action that is satisfactory or 'good enough.'" The word is not used in the 1st edition of Administrative Behavior, but the index to the 3rd edition indicates that pertinent passages are found in the 1st edition on pages 38-41, 80-81, and 240-244.

- The concept of organizational identification in Chapter X.

Simon would return to the concepts from Administrative Behavior in later books that he co-authored, including Public Administration (with Donald W. Smithburg and Victor A. Thompson, 1950); Organizations (with James G. March, 1958); and The Sciences of the Artificial (1969). Among books written by other authors, Administrative Behavior influenced:

- The Forest Ranger, a Study in Administrative Behavior by Herbert Kaufman (1960).
- A Behavioral Theory of the Firm by Richard Cyert and James G. March (1963). Together, Simon (1947), March and Simon (1958), and Cyert and March (1963) are considered the "foundational works" for the "Carnegie School" of organizational decision-making and economics based at Carnegie Mellon University.
- Essence of Decision: Explaining the Cuban Missile Crisis by Graham T. Allison (1971), specifically the "organizational process model" explanation for the crisis.

In 1978, Sune Carlson said in a speech at the ceremony awarding Simon a Nobel Prize in Economics:

…the study of the structure and the decision-making of the firm became an important task in economic science. … In his epoch-making book Administrative Behavior, which first appeared in 1947 and which has been translated into nearly a dozen languages, as well as in a number of subsequent works, Simon describes the company as an adaptive system of physical, personal and social components, which are held together by a network of intercommunications and by the willingness of its members to co-operate and to work towards common goals. …

Nevertheless, it was reported that economists Albert Ando and William Baumol had "made little reference to Administrative Behavior" in arguing to the Nobel Prize Committee that Simon should win.

Between 1955 and 1988, the book was translated into 12 languages: Chinese, Dutch, Finnish, French, German, Italian, Japanese, Korean, Polish, Portuguese, Spanish, and Swedish. A set of 12 papers about the book appeared in Public Administration Quarterly in 1988-1989 for the book's 40th anniversary.

In 1990, Sherwood reported in Public Administration Review that 19 of 20 members of an informal advisory panel voted Administrative Behavior one of the "five or six most influential" books in academic public administration published between 1940 and 1990, making it the "public administration book of the half century." It was the "overwhelming leader" among the books nominated, receiving "twice as many nominations as any other book." Despite over 150,000 copies of the book having been sold in English, in a small survey of recent graduates from a Master of Public Administration program, Sherwood found widespread belief in the administrative proverbs that Simon attempted to discredit in Chapter II.

The fourth edition of the book was released in 1997; its Introduction noted the book's "fiftieth birthday." The book was cited in obituaries of Simon in 2001.

By 2009, the book had received 7,746 citations on Google Scholar. Of the articles that cited the book, the articles that were most-cited concerned organizational learning, the economic sociology, transaction cost economics, and organizational decision making. Administrative Behavior appeared in at least three lists of "best" or "most influential" management and business books between 2001 and 2011. As of 2012, the fourth edition of the book is still in print.
