= Maneet Ahuja =

American business journalist and author (born 1984)

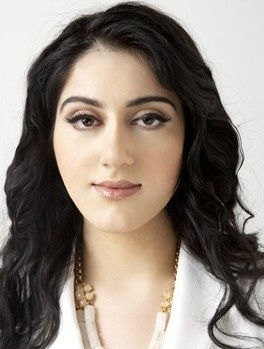
- Born: 1984 (age 41–42)
- Education: Columbia University (Knight-Bagehot Fellowship)
- Occupations: Journalist, Author, Editor-at-Large
- Employer: Forbes
- Known for: Founder of ICONOCLAST and Delivering Alpha, Author of the Alpha Masters,
- Awards: CNBC Enterprise Award (2009); Forbes 30 Under 30 (2012)

Maneet Ahuja (born 1984) is an American business journalist, author and media executive. She is the Editor-at-Large at Forbes, where she covers the intersection of Wall Street, billionaires, and entrepreneurial capitalism. She is the founder of ICONOCLAST, Forbes’ global leadership summit, which convenes figures from finance, business, technology, philanthropy, sports, and public policy. She is also host of a weekly show under her namesake ICONOCLAST brand live from the Nasdaq Marketsite. Previously, Ahuja worked at CNBC, where she launched the network’s hedge fund coverage and co-created the Delivering Alpha conference. She is the author of The Alpha Masters: Unlocking the Genius of the World’s Top Hedge Funds (2012).

Ahuja serves as Chair of Editorial Initiatives at the Newswomen's Club of New York, and is also an elected member of the Economic Club of New York.

She was previously on the Council of Advocates for Mt. Sinai Hospital and the United Nations Commission on the Status of Women.

== Early life and education ==
Ahuja was born into a Sikh family originally from Punjab, India.

She is a graduate of Columbia University Graduate School of Journalism, where she was awarded the Knight-Bagehot Fellowship in Economics and Business Journalism.

== Career ==
=== Early career ===
Ahuja began her career at Citigroup in 2002 as a credit risk analyst. She later worked in global economics and equity research at Merrill Lynch before joining The Wall Street Journal‘s Money & Investing team, becoming one of the publication’s youngest staffers.

=== CNBC ===
Ahuja joined CNBC in 2008, where she specialized in hedge funds, institutional investing, financial markets, and Wall Street. The following year she was awarded the network's Enterprise Award for her coverage of the hedge fund industry. Ahuja's work on CNBC's Squawk Box includes the first on-air appearance made by Ray Dalio, Founder and CIO of hedge fund Bridgewater Associates and David Tepper, hedge fund manager and the founder of Appaloosa Management, coverage of David Einhorn's warning call before the collapse of Lehman Brothers, and John Paulson's communication to investors following an SEC investigation into the Goldman Sachs "Abacus" deals. She has also covered the World Economic Forum in Davos, Switzerland. In December 2012, Ahuja and CNBC colleague, Kate Kelly, made the first report that Bill Ackman, manager of Pershing Square Capital Management, had a short position on Herbalife, a multi-level marketing company that sells health care products, and considered their business model to be a pyramid scheme.

She helped launch CNBC’s dedicated hedge fund coverage and co-created the network’s annual Delivering Alpha conference in partnership with Institutional Investor. She also co-founded CNBC’s Disruptors franchise, focused on technology entrepreneurs and innovation.

=== Megatrends Podcast ===
From 2018 to 2020, she was the host of the Megatrends podcast on Spotify that covered global economic shifts and was produced by Gimlet Media.

=== Forbes ===
Ahuja joined Forbes as senior editor in 2020 and became editor-at-large in 2022. Between 2022 and 2026, she authored cover stories on figures such as Ken Griffin, Mellody Hobson, Todd Boehly, and David Beckham.

==== ICONOCLAST ====
As Editor-at-Large at Forbes, Ahuja founded ICONOCLAST, a global summit convening investors representing over $20 trillion in assets under management (AUM). The summit has featured figures such as Larry Fink, Ken Griffin, Ray Dalio, David M. Solomon, Lewis Hamilton and Mellody Hobson.

In 2025, she was invited by the New York Stock Exchange to ring the Opening Bell on June 4 for her role as Forbes Editor-at-Large and Founder of ICONOCLAST. The same year, she was the only U.S. journalist invited by Indian Prime Minister Narendra Modi to speak at the inaugural WAVES Summit (World Audio Visual & Entertainment Summit) in Mumbai, focused on India's role as a global content hub.

===== ICONOCLAST Podcast =====
In 2026, Forbes launched the Iconoclast Podcast, a weekly interview show hosted by Ahuja and broadcast from the Nasdaq MarketSite. The program features discussions with business executives, politicians, and public figures, including Ray Dalio, Hillary Clinton, and David Beckham.

=== Books ===
==== The Alpha Masters ====
Ahuja's debut book, The Alpha Masters: Unlocking the Genius of the World's Top Hedge Funds was published by John Wiley & Sons in May 2012. The nine-chapter book features profiles of 11 executives in the hedge fund industry: Ray Dalio of Bridgewater Associates, Pierre Lagrange and Tim Wong of Man Group, John Paulson of Paulson & Co., Marc Lasry and Sonia Gardner of Avenue Capital Group, David Tepper of Appaloosa Management, Bill Ackman of Pershing Square Capital Management, Daniel S. Loeb of Third Point LLC, James Chanos of Kynikos Associates LP, and Boaz Weinstein of Saba Capital Management. The book's foreword was written by Mohamed A. El-Erian, CEO of PIMCO, includes blurbs by former U.S. Federal Reserve Chairman Alan Greenspan, and its afterword by economist Myron Scholes and its afterword by economist Myron Scholes, 1997 winner of the Nobel Memorial Prize in Economic Sciences.

==== The Techtonics ====
Ahuja’s second book project, The Techtonics, examining the intersection of technology, capital, and global power, was shortlisted for the 2019 Financial Times and McKinsey Bracken Bower Prize.

== Awards ==
- CNBC Enterprise Award (2009)
- Forbes 30 Under 30 list of media figures (2012)
- Bracken Bower Prize shortlist for The Techtonics (2018)
