= Vijay Krishna =

Vijay Krishna may refer to:

- Vijay Krishna (politician)
- Vijay Krishna (economist)

== See also ==
- Vijay Krishna Acharya, Indian film director and screenwriter
