= John Morgan (economist) =

American economist (1967–2021)

- Born: November 11, 1967; Wilkes-Barre, Pennsylvania
- Died: October 6, 2021 (aged 53); Walnut Creek, California
- Education: B.S. (1989), University of Pennsylvania; Ph.D. (1996), Pennsylvania State University
- Awards: W. Glenn Campbell and Rita Ricardo-Campbell National Fellow
- Scientific career
- Fields: Economics
- Workplaces: University of California, Berkeley

John Morgan (November 11, 1967 – October 6, 2021) was the Oliver E. Williamson and Dolores J. Williamson Chair in the Economics of Organizations at the University of California, Berkeley.

He was the founding director of the U.C. Berkeley Experimental Social Sciences Laboratory (Xlab). He was a member of the editorial board of the California Management Review since 2003. He was the faculty leader of the Center for Executive Education at UC Berkeley.

== Life ==
Morgan was born on November 11, 1967, in Wilkes-Barre, Pennsylvania. He received his B.S. in economics summa cum laude in 1989 from Wharton School of the University of Pennsylvania and Ph.D. in 1996 from Pennsylvania State University. His Ph.D. dissertation, entitled Essays on Auctions, Lotteries, and Contracts, was written under the supervision of Vijay Krishna, Professor of Economics Penn State University.

He worked with Bankruptcy and Forensic Accounting Group, Grant Thornton International, from 1989 to 1992, and as assistant professor of economics and public affairs, Princeton University from 1996 to 2002. He was also a visiting professor at Pennsylvania State University, New York University, Stanford University, University of Cambridge and University of Oxford.

Morgan died on October 6, 2021, in Walnut Creek, California.

== Awards and honors ==
- W. Glenn Campbell and Rita Ricardo-Campbell National Fellowship, 2001–2002.
- Oliver E. Williamson Award, Haas School of Business, 2014
- National Science Foundation Research Grant, 2004-2009, 2001-2004, 1997-1999
- Sloan Research Foundation Fellowship, 2000-2002
- The Review of Economic Studies tour, 1996

== Selected articles and publications ==
- Financing Public Goods by Means of Lotteries , The Review of Economic Studies 67 (2000), pp. 761–784.
- Information Gatekeepers on the Internet and the Competitiveness of Homogeneous Product Markets (with Michael Baye), American Economic Review (2001), pp. 454–74.
- A Model of Expertise (with Vijay Krishna), The Quarterly Journal of Economics (2001), pp. 747–775.
- Voluntary Voting: Costs and Benefits , (with Vijay Krishna), Journal of Economic Theory (2012), pp. 2083–2123.
- An Analysis of Stock Recommendations (with Phillip Stocken), RAND Journal of Economics (2003), pp. 183–203.
