= The Economic Institutions of Capitalism =

The Economic Institutions of Capitalism is a book by Oliver E. Williamson. For Williamson, transaction cost includes the cost incurred in contracting. The book explains principles of transaction cost economics, and applies the transaction cost to theory of institutions. The book explains bounded rationality and opportunism. Based on bounded rationality and opportunism, He analyze economic organizations. He explores trade-offs between the costs of bureaucratic governance and market. Williamson explains the size of firm using the concept of costs of bureaucracy. Williamson explains the use of private orderings. And he explores how to protect institutions from opportunism, such as ownership integration, joint and several ownership in common, financing and incomplete integration of ownership. He explores on the role of credible commitments.
