= Charles C. Holt =

Charles C. Holt (21 May 1921 – 13 December 2010) was Professor at the Department of Management at the McCombs School of Business at the University of Texas at Austin. He is well known for his contributions (and for the contributions of his student, Peter Winters) to exponential smoothing. Holt held BS and MS degrees from the Massachusetts Institute of Technology (1944). He later earned a MA (1950) and a PhD (1955) from the University of Chicago.

== GSIA ==
In his paper from 2002, Charles C. Holt describes how a young but very distinguished-to-be group of economists (himself, Franco Modigliani, John Muth and Herbert A. Simon) came together at the Graduate School of Industrial Administration (GSIA) at Carnegie Mellon University in the 1950s and set out to develop quantitative and computerized decision methods for business and industry. Holt further claims that, "[l]ooking back, all members of the team would likely agree that their GSIA years were among the most interesting and exciting of their careers."

Holt had come from an engineering background at M.I.T. Franco Modigliani had worked on consumption and production smoothing. Jack Muth, with an undergraduate degree in industrial engineering and was interested in applying engineering methods in economics. Herb Simon was dedicated to determining how managers actually made decisions in organizations and in modeling their behavior. The four developed control methods and applied them to microeconomics by computing variables for production, inventories and the labor force in a firm. Their solutions were in the form of linear decision rules where production, for example, at a point in time was made a linear function of past inventory levels. The four were eager not only to develop the theory and mathematics of this subject but also to demonstrate how their ideas could be put to work in an actual enterprise. So they searched around in Pittsburgh until they found a paint factory that was willing to supply them data. The result was one of the earliest uses of control methods in economics, namely Holt, Modigliani, Muth and Simon (1960).

After the completion of the paint-factory work, Holt (1962) turned his attention to the use of linear decision rules in macroeconomic models. He developed a model that was quadratic in the criterion function and linear in the systems equations to analyze fiscal and monetary policy.

All of these developments with optimal linear decision rules can be thought of today as optimal feedback rules which are computed using dynamic programming methods on linear-quadratic systems that yield Riccati equations, which are used to obtain the key components of the feedback gain matrix. This approach is sometimes called "modern control" to distinguish it from "classical control".

== Selected publications ==
- Charles C. Holt (1957), Forecasting Trends and Seasonals by Exponentially Weighted Averages, Carnegie Institute of Technology, Pittsburgh Office of Naval Research memorandum no. 52.
- Charles C. Holt, Franco Modigliani, John F. Muth and Herbert A. Simon (1960), Planning Production, Inventories, and Work Force, Prentice-Hall, Inc., Englewood Cliffs, New Jersey.
- Holt, Charles C. (1962). "Linear Decision Rules for Economic Stabilization and Growth". The Quarterly Journal of Economics. 76 (1): 20–45. doi:10.2307/1891129. JSTOR 1891129.
- Holt, Charles C. (2002). "Learning How to Plan Production, Inventories, and Work Force" (PDF). Operations Research. 50: 96–99. doi:10.1287/opre.50.1.96.17779. Archived from the original (PDF) on 2011-05-16.
- Holt, Charles C. (2004). "Forecasting seasonals and trends by exponentially weighted moving averages". International Journal of Forecasting. 20: 5–10. doi:10.1016/j.ijforecast.2003.09.015.
