= Robert Goodell Brown =

American forecaster (1923–2013)

Robert Goodell Brown (1923–2013) was renowned in field of forecasting, specifically with major contributions of work regarding exponential smoothing. He was an International Institute of Forecasters member, and a past director. He contributed to the field of forecasting with practical books.
