= Richard Cyert =

American economist, statistician

- Born: July 22, 1921; Winona, Minnesota, US
- Died: October 7, 1998 (aged 77); Fox Chapel, Pennsylvania, US

Academic background
- Education: University of Minnesota (BS); Columbia University (PhD)
- Thesis: The Effects of the Business Cycle on Oligopoly Pricing (1952)
- Doctoral advisor: Arthur F. Burns; George Stigler

Academic work
- Discipline: Econometrics
- School or tradition: Carnegie School
- Institutions: Carnegie Mellon University
- Doctoral students: Oliver E. Williamson

Richard Michael Cyert (July 22, 1921 – October 7, 1998) was an American economist, statistician, and organizational theorist, who served as the sixth President of Carnegie Mellon University in Pittsburgh, Pennsylvania, United States. He is known for his seminal 1959 work A Behavioral Theory of the Firm, coauthored with James G. March.

== Early life ==
He was born in Winona, Minnesota, to Jewish parents and grew up in Minneapolis. He received a B.S. from the University of Minnesota in 1943, then joined the U.S. Navy. On the G.I. Bill he earned his Ph.D. in economics from Columbia University following World War II. At Columbia, however, he became a specialist in statistics as well. He taught briefly at City College of New York, then took a position in Pittsburgh at Carnegie Institute of Technology in 1948 to teach statistics in accounting and auditing.

== Carnegie Mellon years ==
Cyert taught economics, statistics, and industrial administration for the next 14 years, then was named dean of the Graduate School of Industrial Administration (GSIA). He was a big proponent of interdisciplinary research and assigned offices to faculty from different departments to the same suite when the new building for GSIA was completed. This proximity, along with the system that rewarded interdisciplinary research, produced some outstanding and groundbreaking research- further highlighting CMU as an institution for cross-discipline research. In 1972 he became the university's sixth president. During his tenure as president, he led Carnegie Mellon through unparalleled growth, transforming it from an Eastern technical school to a premiere American university and focused the university on computer studies. He handled inherited deficits by first cutting costs, which gained him some enemies, and later launched the largest expansion in the school's 98-year history. The number of departments and programs ranked in the top 10 nationally by deans' surveys rose from three—computer science, drama, and industrial administration—to twelve. His administration initiated new program areas in urban and public policy, engineering, architecture, art, cognitive psychology, social history, philosophy, and applied math.

Throughout his administrative career he remained active in his academic fields. He was the author or coauthor of 12 books and wrote more than 100 articles for professional journals and books. In 1973 he was elected as a Fellow of the American Statistical Association.

After retiring from CMU, Cyert served as the chairman of the Board of Trustees of the National Institute of Statistical Sciences at Research Triangle Park, North Carolina. He served for four years, until illness forced him to step down. He died following a long battle with cancer.

For 52 years he was married to Margaret Shadick Cyert; they had three daughters.

Cyert Hall, Carnegie Mellon's computing administration building, is named after Richard Cyert.

== Publications ==
- Models in a Behavioral Theory of the Firm, with Edward Feigenbaum, and James March, Behavioral Science, April, 1959, pp. 81–95
- Behavioral Theory of the Firm with James March. Oxford: Blackwell, 1963. The book was voted the twelfth most influential management book of the 20th century in a poll of the Fellows of the Academy of Management.
- Multi-Period Decision Models with Alternating Choice as a Solution to the Duopoly Problem, with M. H. DeGroot, Quarterly Journal of Economics, August, 1970, pp410–429
- Management Decision Making (1971) with Lawrence A. Welsch
- The American Economy, 1960–2000 (1983)
- Technology and Employment (1987)
- Morris H. DeGroot and Richard M. Cyert (1987). Bayesian Analysis and Uncertainty in Economic Theory. Rowman & Littlefield. ISBN 978-0-8476-7471-8.
- Computational Organization Theory (1994) with Kathleen M. Carley and Michael J. Prietula

About Richard Cyert

- Fenton, Edwin (2000). Carnegie Mellon 1900-2000: A Centennial History. Pittsburgh: Carnegie Mellon University Press. ISBN 0-88748-323-2.

Academic offices
| Preceded by Guyford Stever | Carnegie Mellon University President; 1972–1990 | Succeeded by Robert Mehrabian |
