= A Behavioral Theory of the Firm =

Book by Richard Cyert

- Cover of the second edition
- Author: Richard Cyert and James March
- Publication date: 1963
- ISBN: 0-631-17451-6

The behavioral theory of the firm first appeared in the 1963 book A Behavioral Theory of the Firm by Richard M. Cyert and James G. March. The work on the behavioral theory started in 1952 when March, a political scientist, joined Carnegie Mellon University, where Cyert was an economist.

Before this model was formed, the existing theory of the firm had two main assumptions: profit maximization and perfect knowledge. Cyert and March questioned these two critical assumptions.

== Background ==
A behavioral model of rational choice by Herbert A. Simon paved the way for the behavioral model. Neo-classical economists assumed that firms enjoyed perfect information. In addition the firm maximized profits and did not suffer from internal resource allocation problems.

Advocates of the behavioral approach also challenged the omission of the element of uncertainty from the conventional theory. The behavioral model, like the managerial models of Oliver E. Williamson and Robin Marris, considers a large corporate business firm in which the ownership is separate from the management.

=== Cyert and March ===
These researchers offered four major research themes:

- A small number of key economic decisions
- Development of a general theory, generalizing the results from studies of specific firms
- Linkage of empirical data to models
- Orientation towards process rather than outcomes

== Model framework ==
=== Theory construction ===
The behavioral approach takes the firm as the basic unit of analysis. It attempts to predict behaviour with respect to price, output and resource allocation decisions. It emphasizes the decision-making process.

=== The firm as a coalition of groups ===
The theory argues that while small firms may operate under the guidance of the entrepreneur, such a simple model does not describe larger corporations. These larger firms are coalitions of individuals or groups, which may include managers, stockholders, workers, suppliers and so on.

According to Cyert and March, these groups participate in setting goals and making decisions. Priorities and information may vary by group, potentially creating conflicts. Cyert and March mentioned five goals which real world firms generally possess: production; inventory; market share; sales and profits.

According to the behavioral theory, all the goals must be satisfied, following an implicit order of priority among them.

=== Satisficing behaviour ===
Cyert and March proposed that real firms aim at satisficing rather than maximizing their results. I.e., some groups may settle for "good enough" achievements rather than striving for the best possible outcome. This came from a concept known as bounded rationality, which was developed by Herbert Simon. Bounded rationality means prudent behaviour under a given set of circumstances.

In this model goals are not set to maximize relevant magnitudes such as profits, sales and market share. Instead, goals are compromises negotiated by the groups.

=== The process of decision making ===
In the model, top management sets the goals of the organization. But these goals are implemented through decision making at two levels, one at the top and the second at lower management levels. During approval of proposals of various departments, two criteria are generally employed. A financial measure assesses the availability of the required funds given resources. An improvement measure assesses whether the proposal improves the health of the organization. According to Cyert and March, information is required to take the most appropriate decisions. However, information gathering itself is not Costless and requires resources.

=== Organizational slack ===
To keep the various groups in the organization, payments had to be in excess of what was required for the efficient working of the firm. The difference between the total resources and the necessary payments is called the organizational slack. In conventional economic theory organizational slack is zero, at least at equilibrium. Cyert and March claim that organizational slack plays a stabilizing and adaptive role.

Cyert and March gave many examples of organizational slack such as high dividends paid to shareholders, prices set lower than necessary and wages paid in excess of those required.

== Critical evaluation ==
The behavioral model made a great impact on the theory of the firm. It gave insights in the process of goal formation and fixation of aspiration levels and resource allocation. Its critics claim that the theory is unnecessarily complicated. The virtual assembly of the firm, with the decision-making process as the unit, for the purpose of predicting their behaviour is highly questioned by critics. There has also been staunch support for profit maximization rather than satisficing behaviour, which is one of the core elements of the model.

== Later research ==
The behavioral theory of the firm has become important for much later research in organization theory and management, and has led to empirical studies and simulation modeling in organizational learning, as well as work on the cognitive foundations of firm strategy.

== See also ==
- Theory of the firm
- Carnegie School
