= Kalman J. Cohen =

American economist

Kalman J. Cohen (3 February 1931 – 12 September 2010) was an American economist and among the pioneers of studying market microstructure. Cohen was the Distinguished Bank Research Professor at Duke University's Fuqua School of Business. He served at Duke since 1974. Prior to joining the Duke faculty, he was a tenured professor at Carnegie Mellon University and New York University. He also taught as a visiting professor in Sweden, Denmark, China, and Singapore.

== Career ==
Cohen received his B.A. degree in mathematics at Reed College in 1951. He was awarded a Rhodes Scholarship to study mathematical logic at Oxford University where he earned a M.Litt. degree. He completed M.S. and Ph.D. degrees in economics at Carnegie Institute of Technology. He was awarded the Alexander Henderson Award and received numerous scholarships, fellowships, and research grants from many sources including the National Science Foundation, the Ford Foundation, and the FDIC. Cohen published eight books and over eighty articles in the fields of management science in banking, security market microstructure, corporate finance, computer simulation, management games, and microeconomics.

== Personal life ==
Cohen died on September 12, 2010.
