= Economic opportunism =

Economic opportunism is a term related to the subversion of morality to profit. There exists no agreed general, scientific definition or theory of economic opportunism; the literature usually considers only specific cases and contexts.

== Description ==
There is no agreement about why this is so. Oliver E. Williamson comments:

"Although there is growing agreement that bounded rationality is the appropriate cognitive assumption for describing economic organization, there is less agreement on how the self-interestedness of economic actors should be described. Transaction cost economics has proposed that economic agents be described as opportunistic where this contemplates self-interest seeking with guile. That has turned out to be a controversial formulation."

Market trade supplies no universal morality of its own, except the law of contract and basic practical requirements to settle transactions, while at the same time legal rules, however precise in their formulation, cannot control every last detail of transactions and the interpretation (or implications) thereof. Since economic opportunism must be assessed against some relevant norm or principle, controversy about what that norm or principle should be, makes a general definition difficult.

- Economists frequently cannot even agree on the basic principles of the functioning of economic life, and consequently what constitutes a deviation from those principles is in dispute.
- Market trade is compatible with a great variety of moral norms, religions and political systems, and indeed supporters of the free market claim that this is exactly its advantage: people can choose their own values, buying and selling as they wish within a basic legal framework accepted by all.
- Economic action therefore involves a great variety of motives, some more honorable than others.
- It is not feasible to outlaw many forms of economic opportunism, because any such law could not be effectively enforced, or, such laws would conflict with the civil rights or trading rights of citizens. People often complain about "over-regulation" or “too many rules” — too much “policing” may mean that they no longer take economic initiatives (or become confused about what rule to follow).
- It is frequently disputed in economics whether the opportunist, as a type of “entrepreneur”, creates more opportunities for everybody by what he does, or whether the opportunist is a “pest” with a harmful effect on economic life. Evaluating this objectively can be extraordinarily difficult, because people may not even agree about what the true costs and benefits are.

Adam Smith famously wrote in The Wealth of Nations that:

"By preferring the support of domestic to that of foreign industry, [every individual] intends only his own security; and by directing that industry in such a manner as its produce may be of the greatest value, he intends only his own gain, and he is in this, as in many other cases, led by an invisible hand to promote an end which was no part of his intention. Nor is it always the worse for the society that it was not part of it. By pursuing his own interest he frequently promotes that of the society more effectually than when he really intends to promote it."

If that Smithian view is accepted, then it is difficult to establish that "taking selfish advantage of an economic situation" can in any way be considered “opportunist”, because it does not transgress any moral principle or principle of trade. Indeed, the pursuit of self-interest is in this view beneficial for all, it is exactly what makes the market tick. Furthermore, it is in the interest of market actors to conduct their affairs properly, because if their trading reputation is destroyed, they will be out of business. If it is believed that markets gravitate spontaneously to an equilibrium state, so that price-levels ensure that everybody gets what they want, how can there be any “opportunism”?

At best, one could draw a subtle distinction between “selfishness” and “self-interest”. For example, “self-interest” could be defined as a healthy concern with one's own wellbeing, necessary to survive and prosper, while “selfishness” could be defined as an exclusive or excessive concern with one's own advantage while disregarding the interests of others. Any trading relationship usually involves both cooperation between the trading partners, so that each gets what they want from others, and competition by each party to get the best deal for themselves. So the trading relationship is normally both self-directed and other-directed at the same time. The issue then is, just how far the concerns of the other party or parties to the trade are really taken into account, or to what extent the expectations of others are fully met or honored.

“Selfishness” would then denote a specific type of self-interest which violates a shared principle of trade (or some other principle) in a way that is illegitimate, unfair, unjust in some sense (such as unfair trade, negligence or unfair competition). Adam Smith does not rule out that possibility, acknowledging implicitly that the self-interest and the interest of society may not always be compatible, only “frequently”. Opportunism could then be thought of as an aberration, a "market imperfection" or a “gray area” that sometimes occurs in normal trading activity.

People would not normally trade, if they did not expect to gain something by it; the fact that they do trade, rather than simply rob each other, normally presupposes at least a respect for the basic rights of the party being traded with. Nevertheless, the gains or benefits of trading activity (and indeed the losses), although entirely legal, might be distributed very unequally or in ways not anticipated by previous understandings, and thus accusations of “economic opportunism” can arise nevertheless in many different settings. The entitlement to make some economic gains is then considered to be illegitimate, in some way.

If this is the case, relevant trading obligations (or civil obligations) are usually considered as not being (fully) met or honored, in the pursuit of economic self-interest. Greed is frequently mentioned as a primary motive for economic opportunism. Even so, people might just try to get the most out of a situation for themselves with the least effort they can get away with, disregarding the interests of others who also have a stake in the situation (see stakeholder). An editor of the Financial Times, Martin Wolf, remarked famously about the financial sector that "No [other] industry has a comparable talent for privatizing gains and socializing losses." Some years later, he explained that "Today’s banks represent the incarnation of profit-seeking behavior taken to its logical limits, in which the only question asked by senior staff is not what is their duty or their responsibility, but what can they get away with."

What exactly the rightful or correct obligations of trading parties are to each other, can be open to interpretation “in good faith” (bona fide) by those trading parties or other parties. It may depend on the “understanding” that exists in a business situation. This creates the possibility that, even though — strictly speaking, or formally – everything is done “within the law”, economic actors nevertheless do not (or not fully) honor their trading obligations in some way, for selfish motives, and therefore commit what amounts to deceit, trickery or cheating, by utilizing a somewhat different “interpretation”, “intention”, “expectation” or “understanding”. Therefore, there is always much controversy about what these obligations really are, in the fine detail – it may be that “one man's opportunism is another man's opportunity”.

At issue here is, what one might legitimately expect a trading party to understand or comply with in a business deal, i.e. how the meaning of it is construed, which can differ between trading parties with a different stake or interest in the deal, and might itself change in the course of negotiations. Whether a trading activity is viewed as “opportunistic” might just depend on one's moral viewpoint or informal expectation, because “there is no law against it”. For this reason, institutional economics often evaluates economic opportunism in relation to those norms of acceptable human conduct that, though not necessarily stated in laws, are nevertheless implied by legislation or by jurisprudence.

Glenn R. Parker claims that the five most discussed examples of economic opportunism are:

- adverse selection
- moral hazard
- last-period exploitation, when it is known that competitors or stakeholders are not able to respond to a suitably timed selfish action.
- reneging (in contracts), where a contractual agreement, promise, intention, or understanding of a deal is not fully honoured by a party to the contract, for selfish motives, because it is possible "to get away with it" and/or because there is an incentive to do so.
- shirking, involving some kind of negligence, or failure to acquit oneself of a duty (or a responsibility) previous agreed or implied (see also efficiency wages).

In transaction cost economics, opportunism means self-interest seeking with guile, involving some kind of deliberate deceit and the absence of moral restraint. It could involve deliberately withholding or distorting important business information, shirking (doing less work than agreed), or failing to fulfill formal or informal promises and obligations. It occurs in trading activities, especially where rules and sanctions are lacking, and where the opportunist actor has great power to influence an outcome by the attitude he assumes in practice.

However, others argue that this reflects a narrow view of economic opportunism, because there are many more ways that economic actors can take selfish advantage of other economic actors, even if they do not violate the law. For example, managers can tilt the details of financial reporting in such a way that it favours their own position.
