= Tepper School of Business =

Business school of Carnegie Mellon University

Coordinates: 40.4415°N 79.942°W

David A. Tepper School of Business
- Former name: Graduate School of Industrial Administration (1949-2004)
- Type: Private business school
- Established: 1949
- Founder: William L. Mellon
- Endowment: $ 161.5M
- Dean: Isabelle Bajeux-Besnainou
- Faculty: 102
- Undergraduates: 584
- Postgraduates: 922
- Doctoral students: 76
- Location: 5000 Forbes Avenue, Pittsburgh, Pennsylvania, U.S.
- Campus: 140 acres (57 ha); Urban
- Website: www.cmu.edu/tepper

The Tepper School of Business is the business school of Carnegie Mellon University. It is located in the university's 140-acre (0.57 km^{2}) campus in Pittsburgh, Pennsylvania.

The school offers degrees from the undergraduate through doctoral levels, in addition to executive education programs.

The Tepper School of Business, originally known as the Graduate School of Industrial Administration (GSIA), was founded in 1949 by William Larimer Mellon. In March 2004, the school received a record $55 million gift from alumnus David Tepper and was renamed the David A. Tepper School of Business.

Numerous Nobel Prize-winning economists have been affiliated with the school, including alumni Dale T. Mortensen, Oliver Williamson, Edward Prescott, Finn Kydland and faculty members Herbert A. Simon, Franco Modigliani, Merton Miller, Robert Lucas, and Lars Peter Hansen.

== History ==
In 1946, economist George Leland Bach was hired by the Carnegie Institute of Technology (predecessor of Carnegie Mellon University) to restart the school's economics department. Bach had previously been working at the Federal Reserve during World War II. He added William W. Cooper from the field of Operations Research (which had increased its visibility during the war) and Herbert A. Simon, a political scientist who was to direct the undergraduate business program. The beginnings of the Cold War were applying pressure on the academic community to increase US managerial ability, and when William Larimer Mellon gave a $6 million grant to found a school of industrial administration, Bach became the first dean, bringing along the entire economics department.

Under Bach's leadership, in 1958, the school's Management Game was the first to use computer simulations for experiential learning of business roles; such simulations have subsequently been adopted by other institutions. In 1989, the school's Financial Analysis and Security Trading Center (FAST) was the first educational institution to successfully replicate the live international data feeds and sophisticated software of Wall Street trading firms.

Prior to the founding of the Tepper School, management education typically used the case method approach popularized at the Harvard Business School, based upon examples from successful companies and microeconomic theory. Although the Tepper School did not entirely abandon those traditional models and theories, it has focused on management science, or decision making based on quantitative models and an analytical approach.

In the 1950s and 1960s, the Tepper School of Business led the intellectual movement known as the Carnegie School, a freshwater economics approach which emphasized behavioral, decision-making, and quantitative methods. As an example, the school has produced nine Nobel Prize winners in Economics: Robert Lucas, Jr., Merton Miller, Franco Modigliani, Herbert A. Simon, Oliver E. Williamson, Edward Prescott, Finn Kydland, Dale T. Mortensen, and Lars Peter Hansen. Lucas was awarded the prize for developing and applying the theory of rational expectations, an econometric hypothesis that directly challenged Keynesian orthodoxy. Modigliani's prize recognized his life-cycle hypothesis, which attempts to explain the level of saving in the economy. Modigliani proposed that consumers would aim for a stable level of income throughout their lifetime, for example by saving during their working years and spending during their retirement. Miller's prize was awarded in recognition of his contributions to corporate finance. The results of his research—in collaboration with Franco Modigliani—are now taught in every business school in the country. Simon's prize was given for his development of the idea of bounded rationality in economics, described as "pioneering research into the decision-making process within economic organizations". In 2004, Kydland and Prescott received the Nobel Prize for "their contributions to dynamic macroeconomics: the time consistency of economic policy and the driving forces behind business cycles".

On March 19, 2004, alumnus David Tepper, founder of hedge fund Appaloosa Management, announced that he would make a single donation of $55 million to Carnegie Mellon University's Graduate School of Industrial Administration. This donation was made after he had been encouraged by Kenneth Dunn, his former professor (who became dean of the school). Tepper accepted the suggestion but made the contribution a “naming gift” and suggested that the school's name be changed to the David A. Tepper School of Business. In November 2013, Carnegie Mellon announced another gift of $67 million from Tepper to develop the Tepper Quadrangle on the north campus. The Tepper Quad includes a new Tepper School facility across the street from the Heinz College as well as other university-wide buildings and a welcome center which serves as a public gateway to the university. The Tepper Quad was dedicated on September 13, 2018.

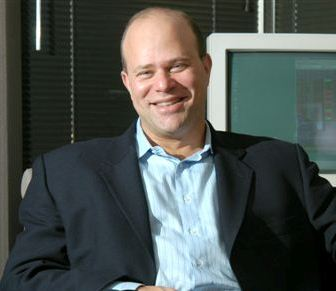
David A. Tepper '82, benefactor of the School

The School of Computer Science and the Heinz College were spin-offs by the Graduate School of Industrial Administration's faculty.

== Undergraduate programs ==
=== Undergraduate Business ===
The school offers a traditional four-year undergraduate degree in business administration. The program's coursework places an emphasis on quantitative decision making and analytical problem solving. The structure of the undergraduate program is distinctly different from the Master of Business Administration (MBA) program, emphasizing breadth of academic experience over focused professionally oriented courses. Students major in business administration and choose one or two of the following concentration areas to specialize in:

- Accounting
- Business Analytics
- Business Technology
- Entrepreneurship
- Finance
- Graphic Communications
- International Business
- Leadership & Organizational Effectiveness
- Marketing
- Operations Management

In addition to the major in business administration, Tepper requires students to either minor or second major in other programs of the university.

In August 2017, Tepper School of Business updated its overload policy. Students will not receive an automatic approval for overloading their course schedule. Rather, students will need to complete a petition to receive an overload approval; the petition is reviewed by the UBA program. Students must have a cumulative QPA of 3.5 through the prior semester or at the end of the fall semester to petition for overload. A course overload is any schedule with more than 50 units in a semester. Students can receive no more than 7 units for a total of 57 units. This change to the Overload Policy impacts Tepper students beginning in spring 2018.

In fall 2020, there were 584 total students enrolled in the undergraduate program.

=== Undergraduate Economics ===
The Undergraduate Economics Program is jointly administered by the Tepper School and the Dietrich College of Humanities and Social Sciences. It has been designed to prepare students for careers as economic analysts in either the private or public sector, for advanced professional studies in business, law and public policy, as well as for entry into PhD programs in Economics, Finance, and related fields.

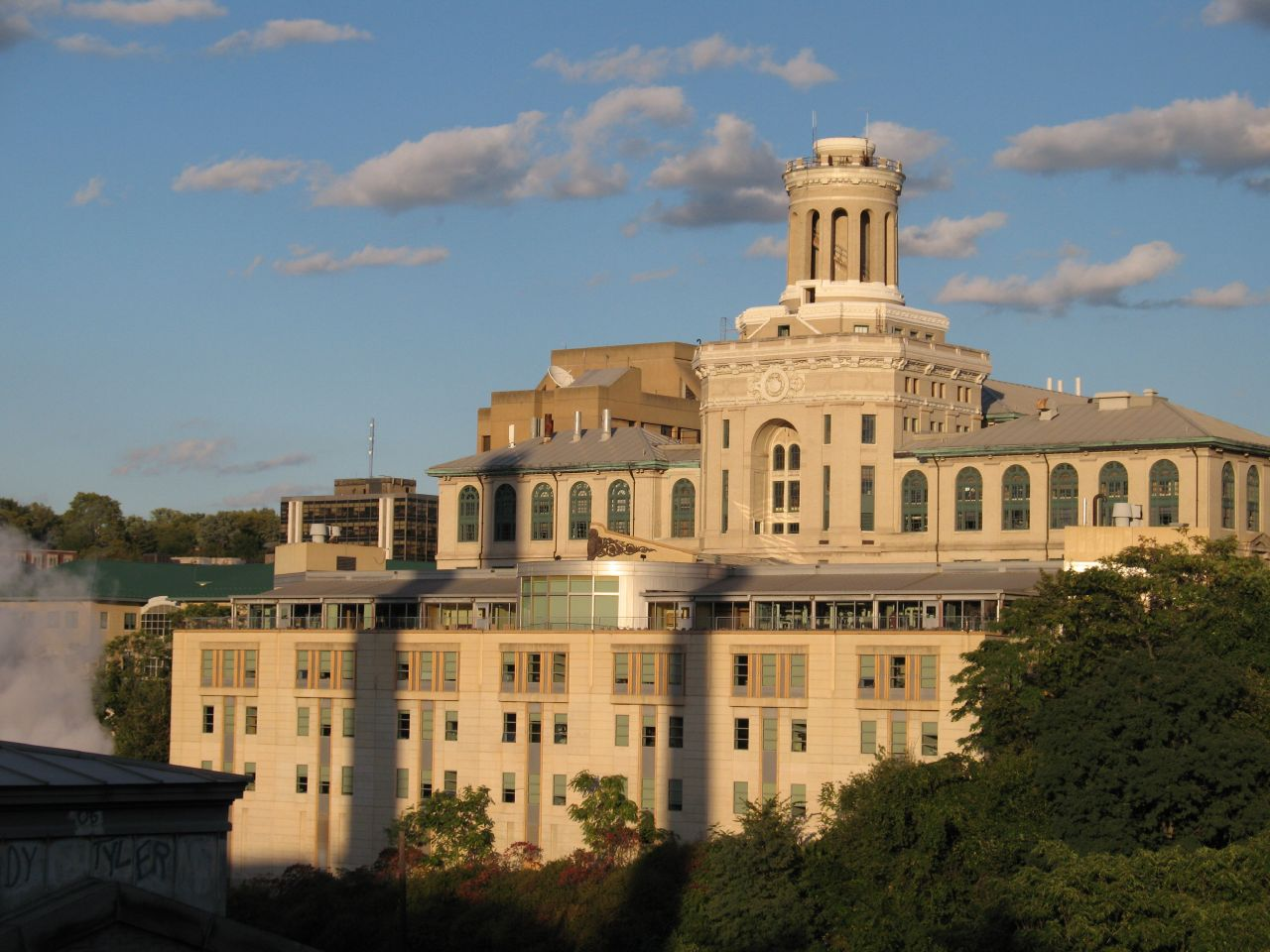
View of Hamerschlag Hall at Carnegie Mellon University

== MBA programs ==
The school's primary MBA degree (previously named MSIA-Master of Science in Industrial Administration) is a two-year, full-time program, during which most students complete an internship in the summer between the first and second year of study. Students may take classes in lieu of a summer internship, which allows full-time students to complete their studies in 16 months. Working professionals in the Pittsburgh area may also complete the MBA degree in the evening as members of the flex-time program.

The mini-semester system is half the length of a traditional academic semester, with four mini-semesters per academic year. Each is 7.5 weeks long, and students typically take 5 different courses each mini-semester. This system, which was pioneered by the Tepper School, allows students to take more than 32 different courses while enrolled in the MBA program. The Tepper School prefers this structure as students can gain exposure to a greater breadth of topics, as well as several electives.

The MBA curriculum is designed to increase in complexity and application throughout students' time at the Tepper School. The first year builds a fundamental skill set in the core disciplines, including Finance, Operations, Marketing, Strategy, Organizational Behavior and Technology. Year two advances the theories and analytical framework developed in the first year to provide breadth and depth in areas that support corporate strategy and general management as students complete three to four concentrations in specific functional areas. In lieu of selecting three to four general management concentrations, second year students may complete courses in satisfaction of specialized MBA Tracks.

The Center for Innovation and Entrepreneurship at Tepper holds an annual Venture Competition every spring in three tracks: Technology, Life Sciences, and Sustainable Technology. Teams from many universities and countries compete for cash prizes and venture startup assistance. Entrepreneurship education was pioneered at the school in the 1970s, under the leadership of Mr. Jack Thorne.

The Management Game was first introduced by Carnegie Mellon in 1958 and has been adopted by many other business schools as an effective business simulation model. Tepper students work with an external board of directors to manage a multinational corporation, guiding the organization through a wide range of issues including global expansion, labor negotiations, operations, market share, shifting economies and financial performance.

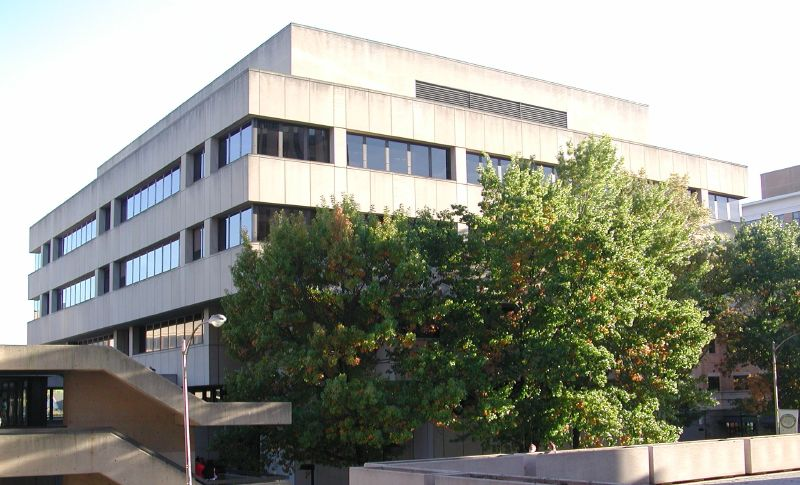
The Barco Law Building: Home of the University of Pittsburgh School of Law. The JD/MBA program is the only Tepper School joint degree taught partially outside of Carnegie Mellon.

MBA students also have a Capstone project, which is like a culmination of all the students work at Tepper. It is akin to a final year project where the students work with various firms on real world problems.

The General Management MBA Track, the core track serves as an umbrella academic option due to the flexibility associated with multiple concentrations. The General Management MBA Track complements the eight other Tepper MBA Tracks: Analytical Marketing Strategy, Biotechnology, Entrepreneurship in Organizations, Global Enterprise Management, Management of Innovation & Product Development, Technology Leadership, Operations Research, and Investment Strategy.

Tepper also offers the following joint and dual MBA degrees:

- Computational Finance
- Software Engineering
- Civil and Environmental Engineering
- Juris Doctor (Law) with the University of Pittsburgh
- Public Policy and Management with the Heinz College
- Healthcare Policy and Management with the Heinz College
- Outstanding undergraduates from any major are eligible for a 3-2 accelerated MBA program

In fall 2020, there were 586 total students enrolled in the full-time MBA program.

== MS in Computational Finance ==
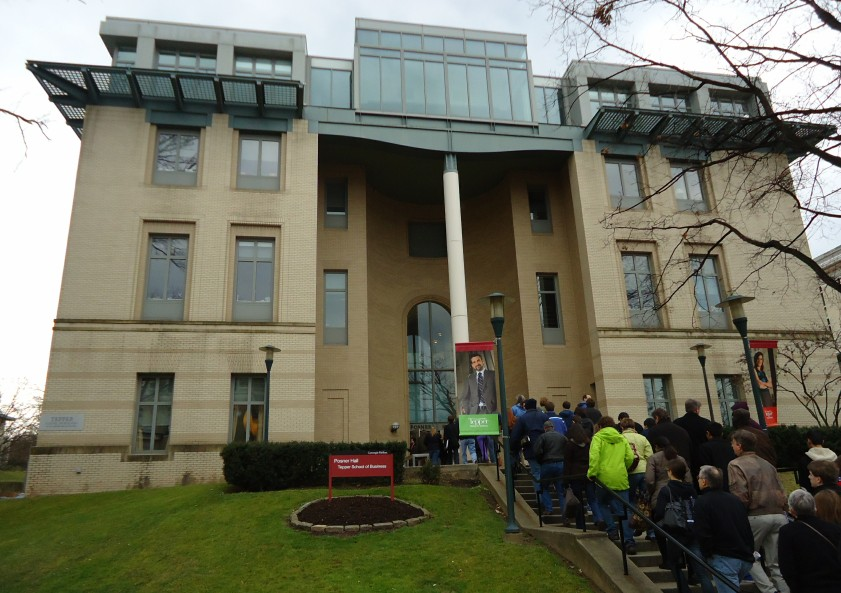
A tour group inspects the premises.

The Master of Science in Computational Finance (MSCF) degree is primarily granted through a sixteen-month full-time program. The school also offers a thirty-three-month part-time degree program and four non-degree certificate programs. Certificate students focus on one "stream" of the MSCF degree curriculum: Mathematics, Statistics, or Financial Computing.

The curriculum consists of courses in finance, traditional finance theories of equity and bond portfolio management, the stochastic calculus models on which derivative trading is based, the application of these models in both fixed income markets and equity markets, computational methods including Monte Carlo simulation and finite difference approximations of partial differential equations, and statistical methodologies including regression and time series, culminating with courses on statistical arbitrage, risk management and dynamic asset management. Early in the program, students are taught C++, which enables them to build the computational financial models necessary for their finance courses. The program's capstone is a sophisticated financial computing course.

Twenty full-time faculty instruct 40 full-time students in Pittsburgh and 51 full and part-time students in the financial district of New York City. The primary method of instruction for the New York campus is live, interactive video. Lectures are recorded and made immediately available to students via the internet. Faculty teach twice every seven weeks in New York at which times the students are invited to join the professor for lunch after class.

== MS in Product Management ==
The Tepper School's Master of Science in Product management (MSPM) degree is granted through a twelve-month, full-time program. Similar to the Tepper School's MBA program, the MSPM curriculum follows a mini-semester system; a mini is the same time requirement as a half-semester. MSPM program is one-of-a-kind and is offered through the School of Computer Science and Tepper School of Business. It is a STEM-designated program which combines the best of both schools, giving students an efficient, focused, and effective path to career in product management.

The program includes mix of technical, business and design courses and is taught by accomplished faculty from Tepper School of Business, School of Computer Science and HCII.

To earn MSPM degree, students must complete a total of 111 units of coursework, which includes a mandatory summer internship and a semester-long capstone project. The capstone takes the form of a product management project, in which students work with product companies on solving the problems for their customers and report their findings to company leaders at project completion.

== MS Business Analytics ==
The Tepper School's online Master of Science in Business Analytics (MSBA) degree is granted through an eighteen-month, mostly online program. Similar to the Tepper School's MBA program, the MSBA curriculum follows a mini-semester system; a mini is the same time requirement as a half-semester. The online format delivers a blend of synchronous learning and asynchronous learning, including weekly live video sessions, recorded video and presentations as well as reading assignments.

The first portion of the MSBA program consists of two foundation courses in statistics and programming; these courses are offered in a self-study, pass/fail format. Once students pass these courses, they can move through the rest of the core coursework, which includes courses in machine learning and data mining, optimization, data management, business communication, as well as specific business domains such as analytical marketing, finance, supply chain analytics, and people analytics.

To earn their MSBA, students must complete a total of 108 units of coursework, culminating in a capstone project that extends across two minis. The capstone takes the form of a business analytics project, in which students work with a large business data set to develop descriptive, predictive, and prescriptive analytical models and report their findings to company leaders at project completion.

Many of the faculty who teach the online MSBA program also teach on campus at the Tepper School of Business or at CMU's School of Computer Science.

== Doctoral program ==
The doctoral degree is organized around a preliminary set of courses in the core disciplines of Economics, Organizational Behavior and Theory, and Operations Research. The foundational knowledge and methodologies that students in the doctoral program learn form the basis for further study and research either in one of the core disciplines, or in one or more of the remaining functional areas of business: Accounting, Financial Economics, Business Technologies, Marketing, or Operations Management.

The school also offers PhD degrees jointly with other colleges in the University:

- Algorithms, Combinatorics, and Optimization (joint with Mathematics and Computer Science)
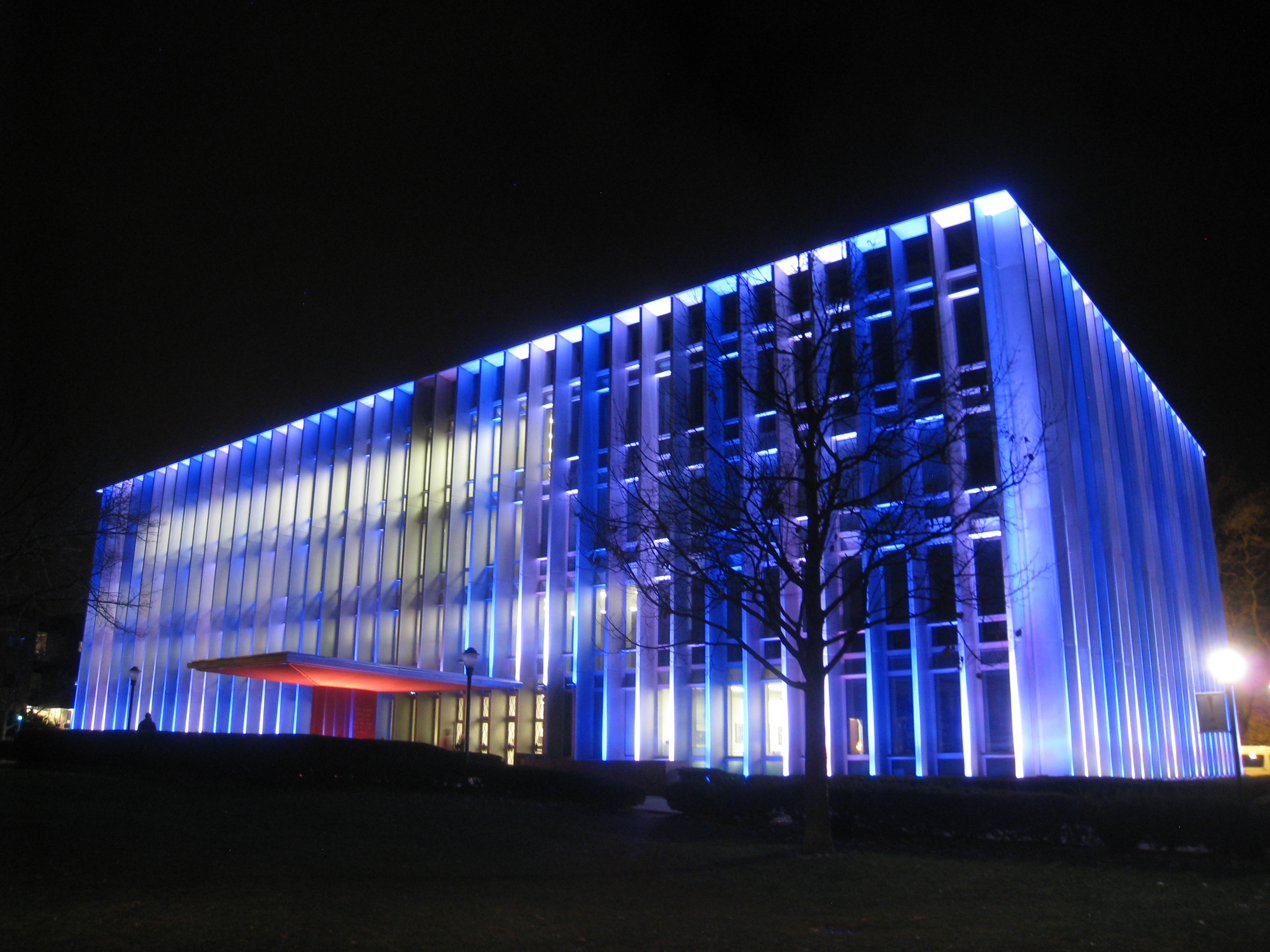
  The Hunt Library at Carnegie Mellon University is the primary source of hardcopy research material for students and faculty at the Tepper School
- Behavioral Economics (joint with the Department of Social and Decision Sciences)
- Behavioral Marketing and Decision Research (joint with the Department of Social and Decision Sciences)
- Economics and Public Policy (joint with the Heinz College)

All doctoral candidates receive full tuition, plus a stipend package for five years, through the William Larimer Mellon Fund.

== Executive Education ==
Tepper Executive Education offers both open enrollment and custom programs for executive leadership training. Programs include studies in the fields of Advanced Analytics, Communication, Disruptive and Emerging Technology, Diversity, Equity, Inclusion and Belonging, Innovation, and Strategic Leadership.

== International study ==
Global Study Abroad

The International Management MBA Track features an eight-week global experience in which students travel to Western and Eastern Europe to study emerging, transitional and competitive economies. During study abroad, students experience real-world aspects of classroom work through manufacturing tours, presentations at financial institutions, meetings with government and non-governmental organizations as well as the experience of living in an international setting. This program operates in partnership with the WHU – Otto Beisheim School of Management.

Undergraduate business students are also encouraged to explore opportunities to learn about different cultures in which to live and work. Each year students travel abroad as part of a capstone educational experience.

== Research centers and initiatives ==
From its outset, academic research has been one of the primary focuses of the Tepper School. When speaking of the school's founders, one author stated "Research was their fundamental engine of progress". The Tepper School has established 16 different research centers to continue the emphasis on research established at the school's founding.

- Accelerate Leadership Center
- Tepper Blockchain Initiative
- The Carnegie Mellon Electricity Industry Center
- Center for Behavioral and Decision Research
- Center for Organizational Learning, Innovation and Knowledge
- Green Design Institute
- PNC Center for Financial Services Innovation
- Swartz Center for Entrepreneurship

== Alexander Henderson Award ==
The Alexander Henderson Award is presented to the student at the Tepper School of Business at Carnegie Mellon University who displays the best work in the field of economic theory. A large proportion of the winners of the award have later made contributions to economics that have changed the practice of the field. Since its inception, four recipients have later been awarded the Nobel Memorial Prize in Economics. Among the deceased award winners are John Muth, known as "the father of the rational expectations revolution"; Albert Ando, among the very pioneers of overlapping-generations models; and Jan Mossin a Norwegian economist, for his contribution to a pricing model in the financial field.

== Rankings ==
Business school rankings

United States
- QS MBA: 20
- Financial Times MBA: 18
- Bloomberg MBA: 16
- USNWR MBA: 16
- USNWR Undergraduate: 6
- THE Business: 15

Global
- QS MBA: 51
- Financial Times MBA: 41
- THE Business: 26

=== U.S. MBA Rankings ===
- Bloomberg (2026), US B-Schools Ranking #9
- QS (2026), US MBA Ranking #18
- QS (2026), Global MBA Ranking #41
- Financial Times (2025), Global MBA Ranking #23
- U.S. News & World Report (2025), #16
- Poets and Quants (2023), Online MBA #2
- Poets and Quants (2022), US MBA Ranking Summary #16
- Financial Times (2022), US MBA Ranking #15
- Fortune (2022), MBA Ranking #15
- U.S. News & World Report (2022), Best Online MBA #4

== See also ==
- List of United States business school rankings
- List of business schools in the United States
- List of Carnegie Mellon University people
- Business School
