= John Muth =

American economist

- Born: September 27, 1930
- Died: October 23, 2005 (aged 75); Key West, Florida

Academic background
- Education: Carnegie Mellon University
- Doctoral advisor: Herbert A. Simon

Academic work
- Discipline: Mathematical economics
- School or tradition: Carnegie School
- Institutions: Carnegie Mellon University, Michigan State University, Indiana University
- Awards: Alexander Henderson Award (1954)
- Website: Information at IDEAS / RePEc

John Fraser Muth (/mjuːθ/; September 27, 1930 – October 23, 2005) was an American economist. He is "the father of the rational expectations revolution in economics", primarily due to his article "Rational Expectations and the Theory of Price Movements" from 1961.

Muth earned his PhD in mathematical economics from Carnegie Mellon University, and was in 1954 the first recipient of the Alexander Henderson Award. He was affiliated with Carnegie Mellon as a research associate from 1956 until 1959, as an assistant professor from 1959 to 1962, and as an associate professor without tenure from 1962 to 1964. He was a full professor at Michigan State University from 1964 to 1969 and a full professor at Indiana University from 1969 until his retirement in 1994.

Muth asserted that expectations "are essentially the same as the predictions of the relevant economic theory." Although he formulated the rational expectations principle in the context of microeconomics it has subsequently become associated with macroeconomics and the work of Robert Lucas, Jr., Finn E. Kydland, Edward C. Prescott, Neil Wallace, Thomas J. Sargent, and others.

== Rationalization of Friedman's adaptive expectations model ==
Phillip Cagan, Milton Friedman and others used the ad hoc updating rule which they labeled adaptive expectations to forecast the hidden state y* (e.g., permanent income). In a 1960 paper, Muth answered the question: for what stochastic process for y will adaptive expectations as postulated by Cagan and Friedman be the optimal forecast of y*. Muth's approach to find recursive optimal linear forecast of a "hidden" state vector, x, given an "observer", y is very similar to the Kalman filter, presented by Rudolf Kálmán in his paper from the same year.

In his paper "Optimal Properties of Exponentially Weighted Forecasts", which was published in the Journal of the American Statistical Association in 1960, Muth rationalized Friedman's adaptive expectations model for permanent income. He did this by reverse engineering a stochastic process for income for which Cagan's expectation formula equals a mathematical expectation of future values conditioned on the infinite history of past incomes. Among Muth's insights was that the stochastic process being forecast should dictate both the distributed lag and the conditioning variables that people use to forecast the future.

== Hypothesis of rational expectations ==
In "Rational Expectations and the Theory of Price Movements", published in 1961, Muth put forward his hypothesis, in contrast to Simon, that "expectations, since they are informed predictions of future events, are essentially the same as the predictions of the relevant economic theory." Muth continued, "At the risk of confusing this purely descriptive hypothesis with a pronouncement as to what firms ought to do, we call such expectations rational."

Muth's notion was that the professors [of economics], even if correct in their model of man, could do no better in predicting than could the hog farmer or steelmaker or insurance company. The notion is one of intellectual modesty.... The common sense is "rationality": therefore Muth called the argument "rational expectations".

— McCloskey, Deirdre N. (1998). The Rhetoric of Economics (2 ed.). Univ of Wisconsin Press. p. 53. ISBN 978-0-299-15814-9.

== Legacy ==
Muth's works influenced almost every area of economic research into dynamic problems.

Of course we knew about [rational expectations]. Muth was a colleague of ours [in the early 1960s]. We just didn't think it was important. The hypothesis was more or less buried during the '60s. Arrow used it in his paper on learning-by-doing in the '60s. Prescott and I used it in that paper of ours on investment. People were aware of it, but I didn't understand then how fundamental a difference it made econometrically. I didn't realize that if you took it seriously you had to rethink the whole question of testing and estimation. I guess no one else did either, except for Muth.

— From the interview with Robert E. Lucas by Arjo Klamer, published in Conversations with economists, 1983, ISBN 0-86598-146-9.

It must be quite an experience to write papers that radical and have people just pat you on the head and say 'That's interesting,' and nothing happens.

— From the interview with Robert E. Lucas by Arjo Klamer, published in Conversations with economists, 1983, ISBN 0-86598-146-9.

Muth's role in the history of economics is unusual. Like Hermann Heinrich Gossen, he became famous for one idea, he provided the analytical key to developments that, in the jargon of scientific journalism, were described as revolutionary, and he was virtually ignored by his immediate contemporaries. However, whereas Gossen had no influence on those developments, his key results being independently rediscovered by Jevons and Walras, the rational expectations economics of the 1970s and 1980s was a direct outgrowth of Muth's seminal idea. In fact, Muth's contribution is one of the relatively few instances in which there is no indication that the history of economics would have taken about the same course in its absence. It was a novel and ingenious idea, it was not "in the air," and no multiple discovery has yet come to light.

— Niehans, Jürg (1990). A History of Economic Theory. The Johns Hopkins University Press. p. 509. ISBN 0-8018-3834-7.

== Major works ==
- Charles C. Holt, Franco Modigliani, John F. Muth, and Herbert A. Simon (1960). Planning Production, Inventories, and Work Force.
- John F. Muth. (1960). "Optimal Properties of Exponentially Weighted Forecasts", Journal of the American Statistical Association, 55(290), pp. 299–306.
- John F. Muth. (1961). "Rational Expectations and the Theory of Price Movements", Econometrica 29, pp. 315–335.
- Muth, John F.; Thompson, Gerald L.; Winters, Peter R. (Collaborator) (1963). Industrial scheduling. Prentice-Hall international series in management. Englewood Cliffs, N.J.: Prentice-Hall.
