= Sune Carlson =

Swedish economist

Sune Carlson (1909 – 22 September 1999) was a Swedish economist. He was considered a pioneer in establishing international business as a research area.

== Life and work ==
Carlson obtained his master's of arts degree in economics at the Stockholm School of Economics in 1932 and his PhD at the University of Chicago in 1936.

In 1951, he published "Executive Behavior", a classic study of chief executive officer behavior. In 1958, Carlson founded the Department of Business Studies at Uppsala University. From 1972 to 1979, he was a member of the committee that selects the laureates for the Sveriges Riksbank Prize in Economic Sciences, the Economics Prize Committee, and served as an associate member from 1980.

He was a member of the Royal Swedish Academy of Engineering Sciences from 1965 and of the Royal Swedish Academy of Sciences from 1972.

== Selected publications ==
- Carlson, Sune. Study on the pure theory of production. (1939).
- Carlson, Sune. Executive behaviour: A study of the work load and the working methods of managing directors. Arno Press, 1951.
- Carlson, Sune. Executive behaviour. (1991).

Articles, a selection

- Carlson, Sune. "International transmission of information and the business firm." The Annals of the American Academy of Political and Social Science 412.1 (1974): 55-63.
