= David Tepper =

American businessman and sports team owner (born 1957)

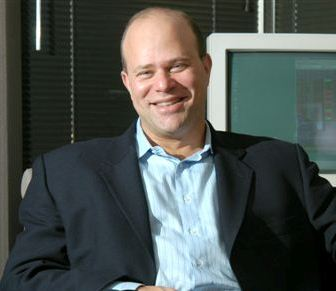
- Tepper in 2006
- Born: David Alan Tepper; September 11, 1957 (age 69); Pittsburgh, Pennsylvania, U.S.
- Education: University of Pittsburgh (BA); Carnegie Mellon University (MS)
- Occupation: Hedge fund manager
- Employer: Appaloosa Management
- Known for: Owner of the Carolina Panthers; Owner of Charlotte FC; President of Appaloosa Management
- Spouses: Marlene Tepper (m. 1986; div. 2016) Nicole Bronish (m. 2019)
- Children: 3

David Alan Tepper (born September 11, 1957) is an American billionaire hedge fund manager, the founder and president of Appaloosa Management, a global hedge fund based in Miami Beach, Florida. He is also the owner of the Carolina Panthers of the National Football League (NFL) and Charlotte FC of Major League Soccer (MLS).

He earned a bachelor's degree in economics from the University of Pittsburgh in 1978, and an MBA from Carnegie Mellon University in 1982. In 2013, he donated his largest gift of $67 million to Carnegie Mellon, whose Tepper School of Business is named after him.

For the 2012 tax year, Institutional Investor's Alpha ranked Tepper's $2.2 billion paycheck as the world's highest for a hedge fund manager. He earned the third position on Forbes ''The Highest-Earning Hedge Fund Managers 2018'' with an annual earnings of $1.5 billion. A 2010 profile in New York described him as the object of "a certain amount of hero worship inside the industry," with one investor calling him "a golden god." In 2019, Tepper revealed plans to eventually convert this hedge fund into a family office.

== Early life and education ==
Tepper was born on September 11, 1957. He is the second of three children of Harry, an accountant, and Roberta, an elementary school teacher. He was raised in a Jewish family in the Stanton Heights neighborhood of the East End of Pittsburgh, Pennsylvania. As a boy he “played football and memorized the baseball statistics on the backs of cards given to him by his grandfather—early evidence of what he claims is a photographic memory.” In a 2018 commencement address at Carnegie Mellon University, he revealed that his father had been physically abusive toward him.

He attended Peabody High School in Pittsburgh's East Liberty neighborhood, followed by the University of Pittsburgh, helping pay his way by working at the Frick Fine Arts library. He received a Bachelor of Arts degree in economics and graduated with honors. He also began small scale investing in various markets during college. His first two investments, given to him by his father, were Pennsylvania Engineering Co. and Career Academies. Both companies went bankrupt.

After graduation he entered the finance industry, working for Equibank as a credit analyst in the treasury department. In 1980, unsatisfied with this position, he enrolled at Carnegie Mellon University's business school to pursue its then-equivalent of an MBA, a Master of Science in Industrial Administration (MSIA).

== Business career ==
=== Republic and Keystone ===
After earning his MBA in 1982, Tepper accepted a position in the treasury department of Republic Steel in Ohio.

In 1984, he was recruited to Keystone Mutual Funds, now part of Evergreen Funds, in Boston.

=== Goldman Sachs ===
In 1985, Tepper was recruited by Goldman Sachs as a credit analyst, which was forming its high yield group in New York City. Within six months he became its head trader, remaining at Goldman for eight years. His primary focus was bankruptcies and special situations.

He is credited with playing a major role in the survival of Goldman Sachs after the 1987 stock market crash. He bought underlying bonds in the financial institutions that had been "crippled by the crash”, which soared in value once the market picked up again. He assumed he would be made a Goldman partner but was passed over, partly because his “loud and profane” manner rubbed other more restrained Goldman executives the wrong way.

=== Appaloosa Management ===
In December 1992, after being passed over for partner at Goldman Sachs twice in two years, Tepper quit. He began operating from a desk in the offices of mutual-fund manager and Goldman client Michael Price, aggressively trading his personal account in hopes of raising enough money to start his own fund. He created Appaloosa Management in early 1993.

In 2001, he generated a 61% return by focusing on distressed bonds, and in the fourth quarter of 2005 he pursued what he saw as better opportunities in Standard & Poor's 500 stocks. Tepper “keeps the market on edge” and makes significant gains year after year by investing in the “diciest of companies,” such as MCI and Mirant. Investments in Conseco and Marconi also led to huge hedge fund profits for the company.

In 2009, Tepper's hedge fund earned about $7 billion by buying distressed financial stocks in February and March (including Bank of America common stock at $3 per share), and then profiting from their recovery that year. $4 billion of those profits went to Tepper's personal wealth, making him the top-earning hedge fund manager of 2009 according to The New York Times.

In a 2010 speech he recommended several supposedly risky investments, including AIG debt, Bank of America equity, and European banks. Citing experts who predicted hyperinflation or depression and deflation, he argued neither would happen: “The point is, markets adapt, people adapt. Don’t listen to all the crap out there.”

In June 2011, he was awarded the Institutional Hedge Fund Firm of the Year. In 2013, Forbes ranked him as top hedge fund earner of 2012, moving him up to the 166th wealthiest person in the world.

Forbes listed Tepper as one of the 25 highest-earning hedge fund managers in 2013 and 2016.

According to Forbes, Tepper has a net worth of $16.7 billion, as of 2022. The Bloomberg Billionaires Index ranked him as the wealthiest person in New Jersey.

As per Forbes list of The Richest People In The World, dated 8 MARCH 2024, David Tepper ranked #94 with a net worth of $20.6 Billion.

In January 2018, Tepper praised President Trump's corporate tax cuts, saying that the bull market still had room to grow and denying it was overvalued. “World growth is higher,” Tepper said. “There's no inflation. The market coming into this year doesn't look rich; in fact, it looks almost as cheap as coming into last year.”

Tepper keeps a pair of brass testicles in a prominent spot on his desk, a present from former employees. He rubs them for luck during the trading day to get a laugh out of colleagues.

In 2020, the largest parts of his portfolio are Alibaba with 13% and Amazon with 11%.

== Professional sports ==
=== Pittsburgh Steelers ===
On September 25, 2009, Tepper purchased a 5% stake in the National Football League's (NFL) Pittsburgh Steelers.

=== Carolina Panthers ===
Tepper bought the NFL's Carolina Panthers from original owner and founder Jerry Richardson in May 2018, and was forced to sell his Steelers shares. He beat out a rival bidder with more ties to the Carolinas, Ben Navarro (Founder and CEO of Beekmok Capital), thanks both to speedy NFL vetting (his Steelers part-ownership allowed the league's owners to bypass the process) and his $2.2 billion bid, the highest in NFL history, lacking other investors (unlike Navarro's). The team's lease on Bank of America Stadium expired after the 2018 season. In a statement, Tepper committed to keeping the team in the Carolinas.

Since the start of his ownership in 2018, the Panthers have had 7 head coaches and 8 consecutive losing seasons, and have also missed the playoffs every season except 2025, in which they finished first in the NFC South with a record of 8-9. Tepper has been described as one of the NFL's worst owners, with the Panthers going into a downturn since his ownership began.

In 2022, Tepper canceled the construction of a practice facility for the team in Rock Hill, South Carolina, after claiming that the city didn't hold up the end of their deal, had his real estate arm declare bankruptcy over the failed project and was forced to demolish the half-built facility.

On September 11, 2022, Tepper welcomed the NFL's first ever transgender cheerleader to the Panthers TopCats squad. Justine Lindsay was a member of the TopCats for 3 years, and was removed from the team before the start of the 2025 season.

On November 26, 2023, after the Panthers lost their game against the Tennessee Titans in Nashville, Tepper gained minor attention after he was heard shouting the word "fuck" as he left the Carolina locker room. The next day, he fired head coach Frank Reich after a 1–10 start to the season.

On December 31, 2023, Tepper threw a drink at a fan during the Panthers' game against the Jacksonville Jaguars. The NFL fined him $300,000 for the incident.

=== Charlotte FC ===
Upon closing the Panthers purchase in 2018, Tepper suggested his desire to bring a Major League Soccer (MLS) franchise to Charlotte. The Panthers organization placed a bid for an expansion team in July 2019 and were awarded the 30th MLS team on December 17, 2019. Charlotte FC was awarded to Tepper on December 17, 2019, and began play in 2022 at Bank of America Stadium. Tepper reportedly paid $325 million in expansion fees for the franchise, setting an MLS record.

== Political activities ==
Tepper and his wife contributed $20,800 to 2013 Jersey City mayoral candidate Steve Fulop. According to the Jersey Journal on October 24, 2012, "David Tepper, the billionaire who supports tenure reform and charter schools, contributed $10,400 to Fulop's council candidates, while Tepper's wife gave the team an additional $10,400." Fulop's former campaign manager Shelley Skinner became the deputy director of Tepper's nonprofit Better Education for Kids.

In 2015, Tepper donated to both U.S. Senator Chuck Schumer and then-U.S. House Speaker John Boehner. In 2016, he donated over $1 million to political action committees supporting Jeb Bush and John Kasich's presidential bids. Tepper supported the Jeb Bush 2016 presidential campaign.

== Philanthropy ==
On March 19, 2004, Tepper announced that he would make a single donation of $55 million to Carnegie Mellon University's business school (then called the Graduate School of Industrial Administration—GSIA). This donation was made after he had been encouraged by Kenneth Dunn, his former professor (who became dean of the school). He accepted the suggestion but made the contribution a “naming gift” and suggested that the school's name be changed to the David A. Tepper School of Business.

In November 2013, Carnegie Mellon announced a $67 million gift from Tepper to develop the Tepper Quadrangle on the north campus. The Tepper Quad will include a new Tepper School of Business facility across the street from the Heinz College as well as other university-wide buildings and a welcome center which will serve as a public gateway to the university. This brings Tepper's total gift to Carnegie Mellon to $125 million.

Tepper has made several large gifts to the University of Pittsburgh, including several endowed undergraduate scholarships and support of academic centers and university-run community outreach programs. Tepper and wife Marlene have pledged $3.4 million to Rutgers University – Mason Gross School of the Arts, the alma mater of his wife.

In 2006, Tepper donated $1 million to United Jewish Communities of MetroWest New Jersey toward their Israel Emergency Campaign.

In March 2012, Tepper and his former colleague, Alan Fournier founded a political action group, Better Education For Kids. "Better Education for Kids is entering the fray as private organizations are poised to play a larger role in education in New Jersey. Christie wants more charter schools, and he’s pushing legislation that would allow private companies to take over struggling public schools." According to the NJ Star Ledger on June 24, 2011, "Last week, the fledgling group launched a $1 million campaign to advertise its mission and solicit donations. Unlike traditional non-profits, Better Education for Kids is a type of non-profit not required to disclose its donors. Though the group cannot formally coordinate its work with lawmakers, it will be advised by two of the state’s top political consultants: Mike DuHaime, a Republican strategist with close ties to Christie, and Jamie Fox, a Democrat who served as former Gov. James E. McGreevey’s chief of staff."

After Hurricane Sandy, David Tepper donated $200,000 in gift cards to Jersey City and Hoboken families who suffered loss in the storm.

Tepper serves as a member of the business board of advisors for the Tepper School of Business at Carnegie Mellon and serves on various boards and committees for charitable and community organizations in New York and New Jersey.

In 2018, Tepper was the keynote speaker at Carnegie Mellon University's 121st Commencement and was awarded an honorary doctorate degree.

In 2020, along with other philanthropists, Tepper donated $2.65 million through David A. Tepper Foundation to help Chicago with its share of struggle from the coronavirus pandemic. All donations to the fund will be distributed to nonprofit organizations, who will help give citizens a wider access to the help they need, such as basic supplies, food, utility, mortgage and rent, household funds, as well as safety and operations assistance. In April 2020, Tepper's cumulative donations toward COVID-19 relief efforts exceeded $22 million.

In September 2021, it was announced that the Nicole & David Tepper Foundation and the David A. Tepper Charitable Foundation would donate $1 million to the Hurricane Ida relief effort.

== Personal life ==
In 1986, he married Marlene Resnick Tepper; they have three children. In 2016, he and his wife divorced. In 2019, he married Nicole Bronish.

He has characterized himself as "a regular upper-middle-class guy who happens to be a billionaire." The Washington Post has described him as “a man who's unpolished and proud of it, whose reputation as a candid and at times controversial voice has grown almost as fast as his net worth.”

In New Jersey, he and his family lived in a modest stone house in Livingston, and his New York offices “resemble[d] a high-end sports bar—all polished mahogany and flat-screen TVs and black-and-gold Steelers paraphernalia—or a wealthy frat house.” He told an interviewer in 2010 that sometimes, “if someone is an asshole, like a waiter at a restaurant, I think, I could just buy this place and fire that guy.”

According to the Post, he "paid $43.5 million for the beachfront mansion of a former Goldman Sachs supervisor who had passed him over for promotion. Then he had the house demolished." He then built a house nearly twice as big on the same property. He had bought the property from the ex-wife of his former boss.

Asked by a reporter about the origins of his strong confidence, Tepper said: "I was never afraid to go back to Pittsburgh and work in the steel mills."

In 2016, he relocated his company to Miami Beach, Florida. He had been New Jersey's richest taxpayer at the time. The move caused a state official to warn of a risk to the budget of New Jersey because of the resulting loss of income tax.

In October 2020, Tepper announced he was returning to New Jersey for family reasons, a move which may cost him up to $120 million in state income tax.

== Bibliography ==
- "Dissident Delphi investor challenges board". The Boston Globe. Reuters. March 16, 2006.
- Forbes staff (November 2005). "#645 David Tepper". The Worlds Billionaires. Forbes magazine.
- Editorial staff (March 29, 2004). "How To Rebuild A B-School". Management. Businessweek. Archived from the original on August 16, 2006.
- staff (2006). "America's Most-Generous Donors". List the 2004 Pledges. The Chronicle of Philanthropy. Archived from the original on March 4, 2021.
- Tepper magazine staff (2004). "A kid from Peabody High School" (PDF). Feature. Carnegie Mellon University. p. 6. Archived from the original (PDF) on June 28, 2006.Guinto, Joseph (September 1, 2004). "To MBA or Not to MBA, That is the Question". Business Feature. American Way magazine. Archived from the original on May 18, 2006.
- Web staff (August 17, 2006). "David Tepper Bio". Tepper School of Business. Archived from the original on July 15, 2006.
- CM Today magazine staff (June 2006). "Wall Street Wizard David Tepper "learns it, earns it and returns it"". Top Stories. Carnegie Mellon University. Archived from the original on June 26, 2004.
