= Vijay Krishna (economist) =

Indian American economist

- Born: 7 February 1956 (age 70)

Academic background
- Education: Delhi University (BA 1976 and MA 1978) Princeton University (PhD 1983)

Academic work
- Discipline: Industrial organisation, Game theory, Auction theory, Vote theory
- Institutions: Pennsylvania State University (1993-present); Harvard University (1984-1993); Columbia University (1982-1984)
- Website: Information at IDEAS / RePEc

Vijay Krishna (born 7 February 1956 in Delhi, India) is an Indian American economist who is a Distinguished Professor of Economics and Job Market Placement Director of the Department of Economics at the Pennsylvania State University.

== Biography ==
Krishna was born on 7 February 1956 in Delhi, India. He obtained his BA in Mathematics and MA in economics from the Delhi University in 1976 and 1978, respectively, and his PhD from the Princeton University in 1983. Krishna taught as assistant professor at the Columbia University from 1982 to 1984 before moving to the Harvard University where he was Assistant Professor from 1984 to 1988 and Associate Professor from 1988 to 1993. He joined the Pennsylvania State University in 1993 as associate professor and has been Professor since 1996.

His research interest cover topics in industrial organisation, economic theory, auction theory, communications in games and vote theory.

Krishna is married and has two children.

== Selected publications ==
Journal articles

- Benoit, J. P. & V. Krishna (1985). "Finitely repeated games". Econometrica, 53 (4), pp. 905–922.
- Benoit, J. P. & V. Krishna (1987). "Dynamic duopoly: prices and quantities". The Review of Economic Studies, 54 (1), pp. 23–35.
- Benoit, J. P. & V. Krishna (1993). "Renegotiation in finitely repeated games". Econometrica, 61 (2), pp. 303–323.
- Krishna, V. & R. Serrano (1996). "Multilateral bargaining". The Review of Economic Studies, 63 (1), pp. 61–80.
- Krishna, V. & J. Morgan (1997). "An analysis of the war of attrition and the all-pay auction". Journal of Economic Theory, 72 (2), pp. 343–362.
- Krishna, V. & E. Maenner (2001). "Convex potentials with an application to mechanism design". Econometrica, 69 (4), pp. 1113–1119.
- Krishna, V. & J. Morgan (2001). "A model of expertise". The Quarterly Journal of Economics, 116 (2), pp. 747–775.
- Benoit, J. P. & V. Krishna (2001). "Multiple-object auctions with budget constrained bidders". The Review of Economic Studies, 68 (1), pp. 155–179.

Books

- Krishna, V. (2009). Auction Theory (2nd ed.). Academic Press/Elsevier. ISBN 978-0123745071.
