= George Leland Bach =

American economist (1915–1994)

George Leland Bach, also known as Lee Bach (1915–1994) was an American economist. He was the Frank E. Buck Professor of Economics and Public Policy at Stanford University.

== Works ==
- Federal Reserve policy-making; a study in Government economic policy formation, 1950
- Economics; an introduction to analysis and policy, 1954
- (with Keith G Lumsden and Richard Attiyeh) Microeconomics; a programmed book, 1966
- Making monetary and fiscal policy, 1971
- The new inflation: causes, effects, cures, 1972
