= Appaloosa Management =

American hedge fund

Appaloosa Management L.P.
- Type: Private
- Industry: Investment Management
- Founded: 1993; 33 years ago
- Founder: David Tepper
- Headquarters: Miami Beach, Florida, U.S.
- Area served: Worldwide
- Key people: David Tepper (president); Michael Palmer (CFO); Jeffrey Kaplan (COO)
- AUM: US$15.3 billion (Jan 2026)
- Website: amlp.com

Appaloosa Management L.P. is an American hedge fund founded in 1993 by David Tepper and Jack Walton specializing in distressed debt. Appaloosa Management invests in public equity and fixed income markets around the world.

== History ==
In 1993, David Tepper and Jack Walton, founded Appaloosa Management, an employee-owned hedge fund, in Chatham, New Jersey. Throughout the 1990s, the firm was known as a junk bond investment boutique, and through the 2000s it was known as a hedge fund. In March 2021, David Tepper said it's increasingly difficult to be bearish on stock rights now, feeling that rising rates are set to stabilize, and that the sell off in treasuries that has driven rates up is probably over.

=== 2002 Conseco & Marconi Corp. ===
In the fourth quarter of 2002, Appaloosa Management's returns were driven largely by positions in the junk bonds and distressed debt of Conseco and Marconi Corp., reflecting a view that the market had reached a bottom.

=== 2007 Delphi ===
In 2007, the firm oversaw an estimated $5.3 billion in assets under management. According to the Financial Times, Appaloosa drew scrutiny for its sizable stake in the bankrupt auto-parts supplier Delphi and for disputes over whether Delphi's management was serving the best interests of shareholders or those of GM and the UAW.

=== 2008 financial crisis through 2011 ===
Appaloosa survived the 2008 financial crisis with relatively few investor redemption orders. From 2009 to 2010, Appaloosa Management's assets under management grew from $5 billion to $12 billion. In November 2010, The New York Times reported total assets under management of $14 billion. In 2010, it was reported that since 1993 Appaloosa Management had returned $12.4 billion to clients—ranking it sixth on a ranking of total returns to clients by managers since inception.

In September 2011, a Delaware bankruptcy court found that Appaloosa Management is one of four hedge funds that had played a role in Washington Mutual's restructuring which might have received confidential information that could have been used to trade improperly in the bank's debt; Appaloosa and the other hedge funds denied any impropriety. In 2011, the company was awarded the Institutional Hedge Fund Firm of the Year award.

In January 2016, Appaloosa's headquarters were relocated to Miami Beach, Florida.

== Investment strategy ==
Appaloosa Management's investments focus on undiversified concentrated investment positions. Appaloosa invests in the global public equity and fixed income markets with a focus on "equities and debt of distressed companies, bonds, exchange warrants, options, futures, notes, and junk bonds." According to BusinessWeek, the firm's client base consists of high-net-worth individuals, pension and profit sharing plans, corporations, foreign governments, foundations, universities, and other organizations." Investors commit to a locked period of three years during which their withdrawals are limited to 25 percent of their total investment.

== Products and performance ==
Appaloosa Management manages four investment vehicles: the offshore Palomino Fund LTD, an offshore and onshore version of its Thoroughbred fund, and its flagship fund Appaloosa Investment. A complete list of current holdings can be found here.

=== Palomino Fund ===
The Palomino Fund from its inception in 1995 to 1998 had a 25 percent return. After Russia defaulted, the fund lost 49 percent of its value between February and September 1998. The fund returned –26.7% percent in 2008 and 117.3 percent in 2009. The company was ranked by Bloomberg Markets as the top performing fund of any hedge fund manager managing over one billion dollars.

=== Appaloosa Investment I ===
In 2001, the fund was up 67 percent followed the next year losing 25 percent. In 2003 the fund saw 149 percent returns for investors.

== Administration ==
The company leaders include:

- David Tepper, Founder and President,
- Michael L. Palmer, Chief Financial Officer,
- Jeffrey L. Kaplan, Chief Operating Officer.
