= Oliver E. Williamson =

American economist (1932–2020)

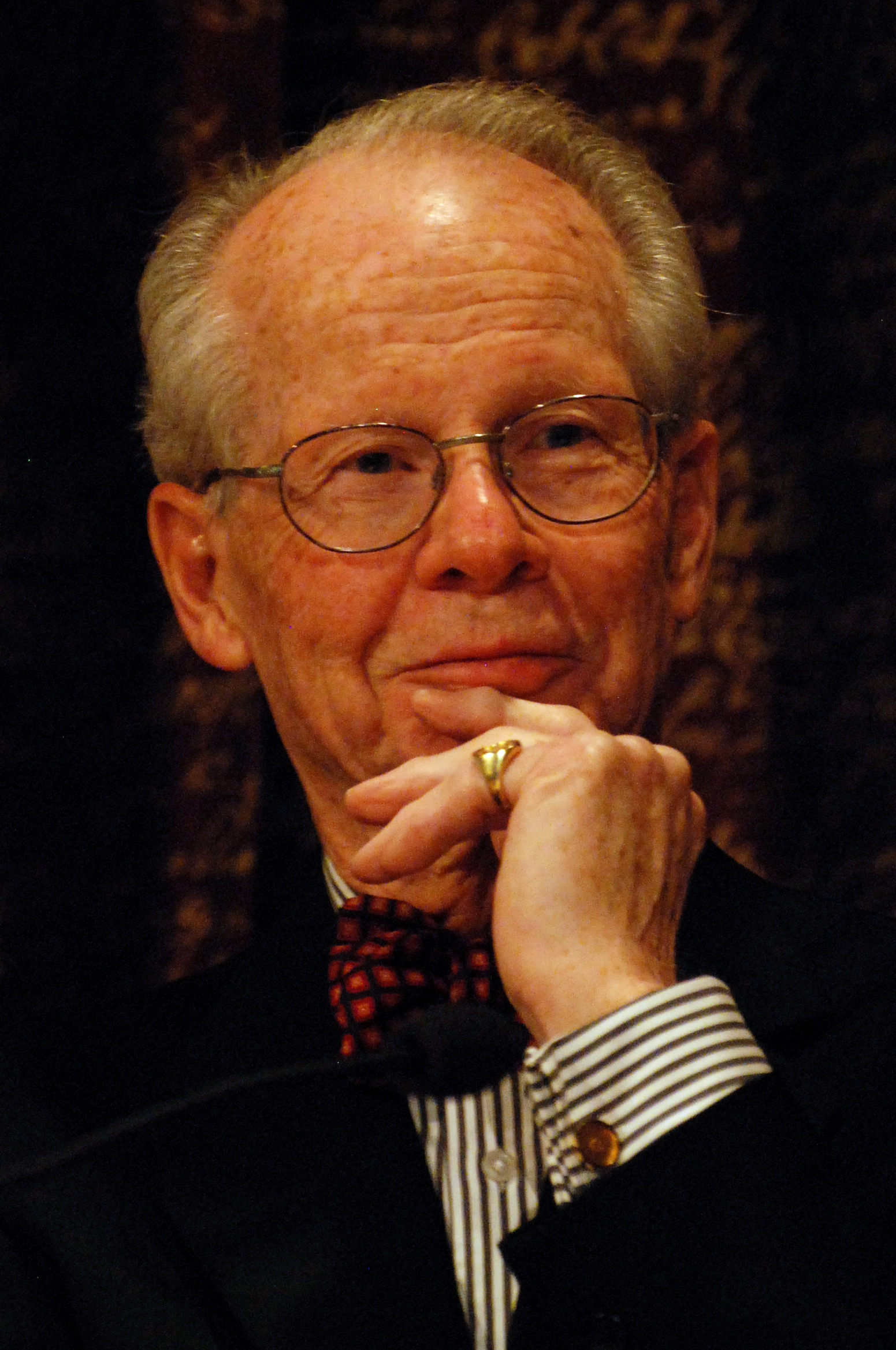
- Williamson in 2009
- Born: Oliver Eaton Williamson; September 27, 1932; Superior, Wisconsin, U.S.
- Died: May 21, 2020 (aged 87); Berkeley, California, U.S.

Academic background
- Education: Massachusetts Institute of Technology (BS); Stanford University (MBA); Carnegie Mellon University (PhD)
- Thesis: The economics of discretionary behavior: nonpecuniary objectives in the theory of the firm (1963)
- Influences: Kenneth Arrow; Chester Barnard; Ronald Coase; Richard Cyert; Friedrich Hayek; Ian Roderick Macneil; Herbert A. Simon; John R. Commons

Academic work
- Discipline: Microeconomics
- School or tradition: New Institutional Economics
- Institutions: University of California, Berkeley; Yale University; University of Pennsylvania
- Awards: John von Neumann Award (1999) Nobel Memorial Prize in Economic Sciences (2009)
- Website: Information at IDEAS / RePEc

Oliver Eaton Williamson (September 27, 1932 – May 21, 2020) was an American economist, a professor at the University of California, Berkeley, and recipient of the 2009 Nobel Memorial Prize in Economic Sciences, which he shared with Elinor Ostrom.

His contributions to transaction cost economics and the theory of the firm have been influential in the social sciences, law and economics. Williamson described his work as "a blend of soft social science and abstract economic theory".

== Life and career ==
Oliver "Olly" Williamson was born in Superior, Wisconsin, on 27 September 1932. He was the son of Sara Lucille (Dunn) and Scott Williamson, both of whom were high school teachers. As a child, Williamson attended Central High School in Superior.

Williamson's dual enrollment between Ripon College and MIT earned him his bachelor's degree in management from the MIT Sloan School of Management in 1955. During his time in his undergraduate academic career, his studies in engineering sparked his initial interest in transaction costs. After graduating, he worked as a project engineer for General Electric, as well as the Central Intelligence Agency.

Williamson received an MBA from Stanford University in 1960, and his PhD from Carnegie Mellon University, formerly Carnegie Tech, in 1963. His dissertation was titled 'The Economics of Discretionary Behaviour: Managerial Objectives in a Theory of the Firm'. A student of Ronald Coase, Herbert A. Simon and Richard Cyert, he specialized in transaction cost economics.

From 1963 to 1965 he was an assistant professor of economics at the University of California, Berkeley. From 1965 to 1983 he was a professor at the University of Pennsylvania and from 1983 to 1988, a Gordon B. Tweedy Professor of Economics of Law and Organization at Yale University. While at Yale, Williamson was a founder of The Journal of Law, Economics, & Organization. He held professorships in business administration, economics, and law at the University of California, Berkeley since 1988 and was the Edgar F. Kaiser Professor Emeritus at the Haas School of Business. As a Fulbright Distinguished Chair, in 1999 he taught economics at the University of Siena.

Found to be one of the most cited authors in the social sciences, in 2009, he was awarded the Nobel Memorial Prize in Economics for "his analysis of economic governance, especially the boundaries of the firm", sharing it with Elinor Ostrom. Williamson died on May 21, 2020, in Berkeley, California.

== Theory ==
By drawing attention at a high theoretical level to equivalences and differences between market and non-market decision-making, management and service provision, Williamson was influential in the 1980s and 1990s debates on the boundaries between the public and private sectors.

His focus on the costs of transactions led Williamson to distinguish between repeated case-by-case bargaining on the one hand and relationship-specific contracts on the other. For example, the repeated purchasing of coal from a spot market to meet the daily or weekly needs of an electric utility would represent case-by-case bargaining. But over time, the utility is likely to form ongoing relationships with a specific supplier, and the economics of the relationship-specific dealings will be importantly different, he argued.

Other economists have tested Williamson's transaction-cost theories in empirical contexts. One important example is a paper by Paul L. Joskow, "Contract Duration and Relationship-Specific Investments: Empirical Evidence from Coal Markets", in American Economic Review, March 1987. The incomplete contracts approach to the theory of the firm and corporate finance is partly based on the work of Williamson and Coase.

Williamson was credited with the development of the term "information impactedness", which applies in situations of unequal access to information. As he explained in Markets and Hierarchies, it exists "mainly because of uncertainty and opportunism, though bounded rationality is involved as well. It exists when true underlying circumstances relevant to the transaction, or related set of transactions, are known to one or more parties but cannot be costlessly discerned by or displayed for others". Thus, Williamson is to be counted among those who have taken issue with the view that the firm is another type of market, characterized by a nexus of contracts. In his own words: "But to regard the corporation only as a nexus of contracts misses much of what is truly distinctive about this mode of governance".

== Nobel Memorial Prize in Economic Sciences ==
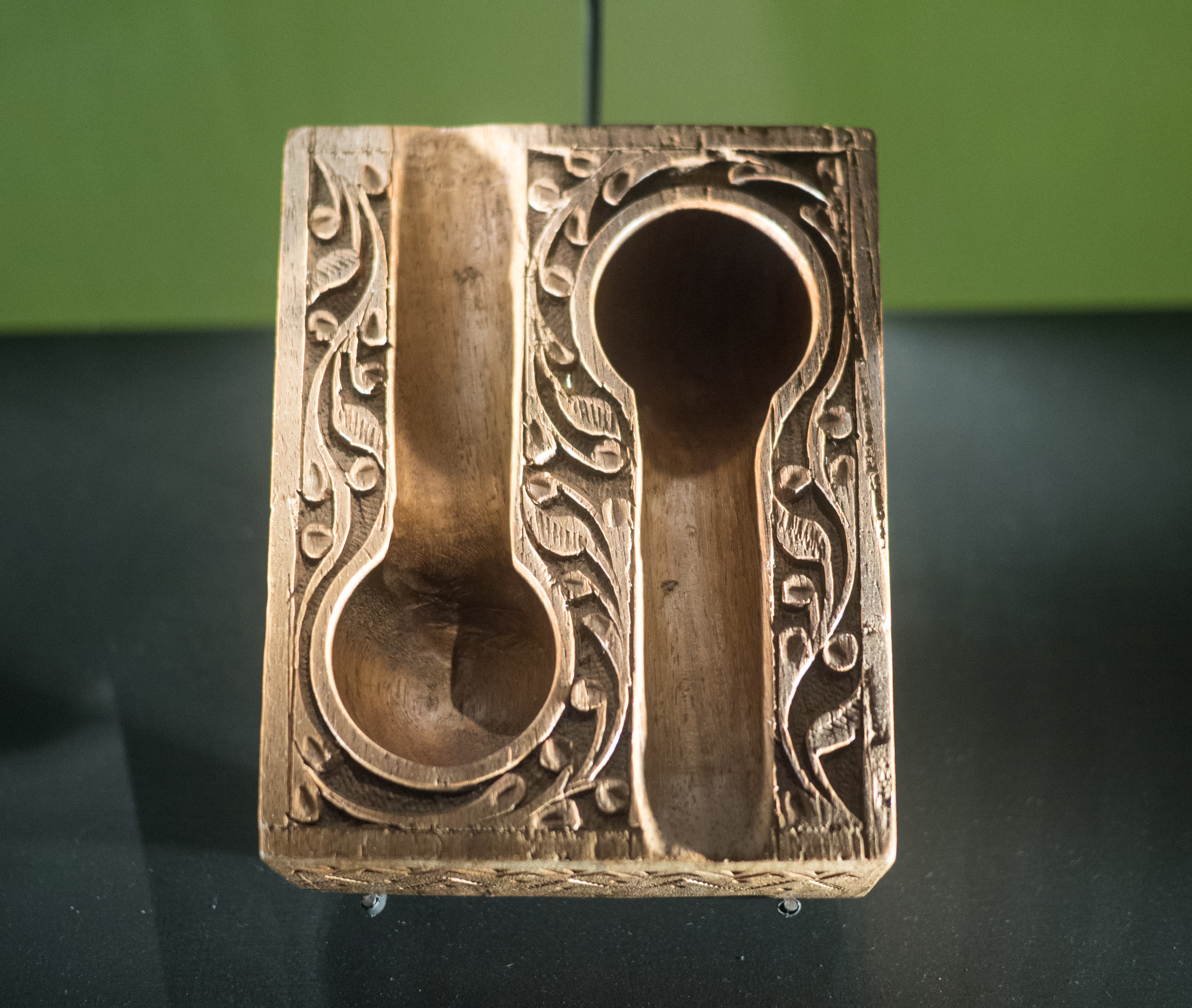
Williamson's pipe holder on display at the Nobel Prize Museum

In 2009, the Royal Swedish Academy of Sciences cited Williamson and Elinor Ostrom to share the 10-million Swedish kronor (£910,000; $1.44 million) prize "for his analysis of economic governance, especially the boundaries of the firm". Williamson, in the BBC's paraphrase of the academy's reasoning, "developed a theory where business firms served as structures for conflict resolution".

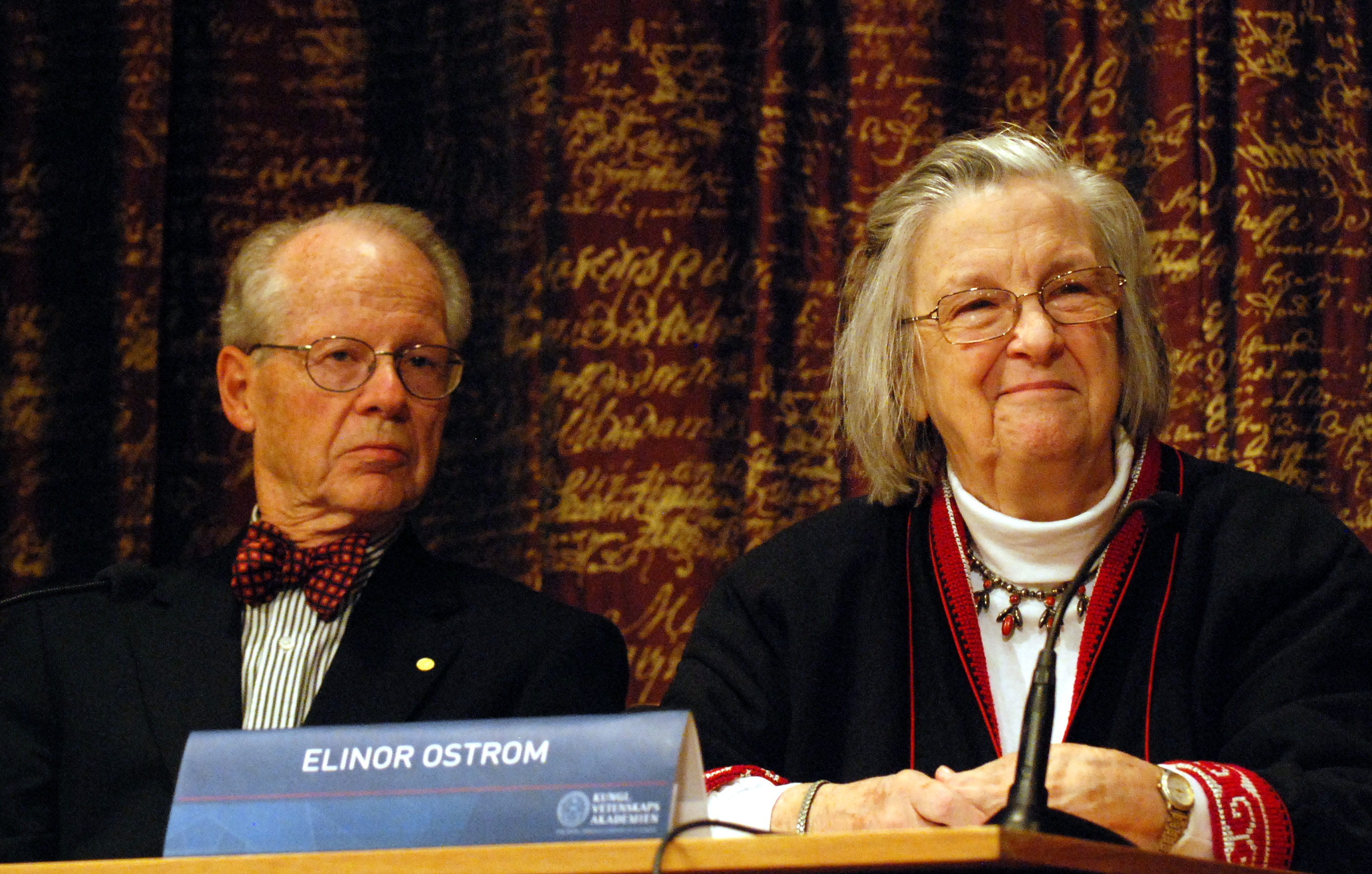
Oliver E. Williamson and Elinor Ostrom at the 2009 Nobel Prize Press Conference.

== Personal life ==
He met his wife Dolores Celini in 1957, while they both lived in Washington, D.C. They had five children.

== Awards and fellowships ==
- The Sveriges Riksbank Prize in Economic Sciences in Memory of Alfred Nobel, 2009.
- Distinguished Fellow, American Economic Association, 2007.
- Horst Claus Recktenwald Prize in Economics, 2004.
- Founding Editor, Journal of Law, Economics, and Organization, 2003
- John von Neumann Award, 1999.
- President, Society for Institutional and Organizational Economics, 1998–2001
- Board of Directors, Society for Institutional and Organizational Economics, 1997–2006
- Fellow, American Academy of Political and Social Science, 1997.
- Member, National Academy of Sciences, 1994.
- Fellow, American Academy of Arts and Sciences, 1983.
- Fellow, Econometric Society, 1977.
- Alexander Henderson Award, 1962.
- Doctoris Honoris Causa in Economics, Université Paris-Dauphine, 2012.
- Doctoris Honoris Causa in Economics, Nice University, 2005.
- Doctoris Honoris Causa in Economics, University of Valencia, 2004.
- Doctoris Honoris Causa in Economics, University of Chile, 2000.
- Honorary Doctorate in Economics and Business Administration, Copenhagen Business School, 2000.
- Doctoris Honoris Causa, HEC Paris, 1997.
- Doctoris Honoris Causa in Business Administration, St. Petersburg University, 1997.
- Doctoris Honoris Causa in Economics, Turku School of Economics and Business Administration, 1995.
- Doctoris Honoris Causa in Economic Science, Groningen University, 1989.
- Doctoris Honoris Causa in Economic Science, University of St. Gallen, 1987.
- Oeconomiae Doctorem Honoris Causa, PhD, Norwegian School of Economics and Business Administration, Jubilee Celebration, 1986.

== Legacy ==
For his dedication to the field and his service to the institution, the Haas School of Business at Berkeley established the Williamson Award in honor of Oliver Williamson. This prestigious award is presented to outstanding faculty members who embody Berkeley's four Defining Leadership Principles - Question the Status Quo, Confidence Without Attitude, Students Always, and Beyond Yourself. Beginning in fiscal year 2013, the Williamson Award has been presented to the following faculty members:

- 2013–2014: Professor John Morgan
- 2014–2015: Professor Teck Ho
- 2015–2016: Professor Toby Stuart
- 2016–2017: Professor Andy Rose
- 2019–2020: Professor Nancy Wallace
- 2022–2023: Associate Professor Ned Augenblick

== Selected papers ==
- Oliver E. Williamson (1981). "The Economics of Organization: The Transaction Cost Approach" (PDF). The American Journal of Sociology. 87 (3): 548–577. doi:10.1086/227496. S2CID 154070008. Archived from the original (PDF) on 2009-05-30.
- Oliver E. Williamson (2002). "The Theory of the Firm as Governance Structure: From Choice to Contract". Journal of Economic Perspectives. 16 (3): 171–195. doi:10.1257/089533002760278776. JSTOR 3216956.

== Books ==
- Williamson, Oliver E. (1975). Markets and Hierarchies: Analysis and Antitrust Implications. New York: Macmillan Publishers. ISBN 978-0029353608.
- Williamson, Oliver E. (1985). The Economic Institutions of Capitalism. New York: Macmillan. ISBN 978-0029348208.
- Williamson, Oliver E. (1989). Antitrust Economics. Basil Blackwell. ISBN 978-0631171829.
- Williamson, Oliver E. (1990). Economic Organization. New York: New York University Press. ISBN 978-0814792407.
- Williamson, Oliver E. (1991). The Nature of the Firm. New York: Oxford University Press. ISBN 978-0195065909.
- Williamson, Oliver E. (1995). Organization Theory: From Chester Barnard to the Present and Beyond. New York: Oxford University Press. ISBN 978-0195098303.
- Williamson, Oliver E. (1996). The Mechanisms of Governance. New York: Oxford University Press. ISBN 978-0195078244.
- Williamson, Oliver E. (1996). Industrial Organization. US: Elgar Pub. ISBN 978-1858984889.

== See also ==
- New institutional economics

Awards
Preceded by Paul Krugman	Laureate of the Nobel Memorial Prize in Economics; 2009; Served alongside: Elinor Ostrom	Succeeded by Peter A. Diamond; Dale T. Mortensen; Christopher A. Pissarides
