= Wouter den Haan =

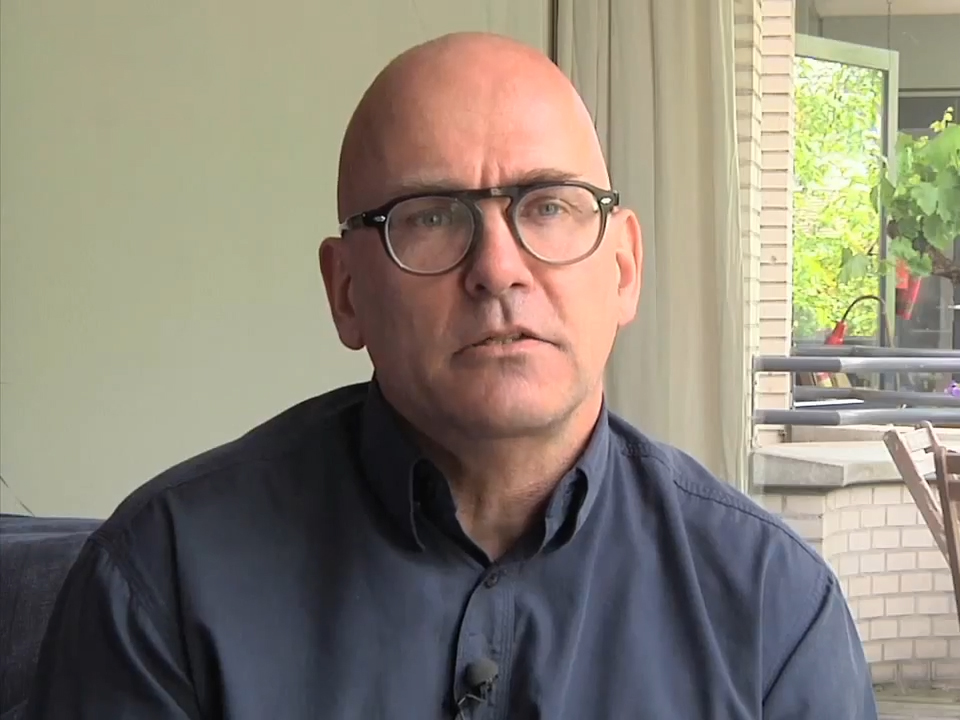
- Education: Erasmus University; Carnegie Mellon
- Scientific career
- Fields: Economics
- Workplaces: University of California at San Diego; London Business School; University of Amsterdam; London School of Economics

Wouter J. den Haan (or Denhaan) (born 22 July 1962) is a professor of economics at the London School of Economics, research fellow and programme director of the CEPR, and co-director of the Centre for Macroeconomics. Currently, his main areas of interest are business cycles, frictions in financial and labor markets, and numerical methods to solve models with a large number of heterogeneous agents.

== Biography ==
He graduated cum laude from the MA program at Erasmus University, and received his PhD degree at Carnegie Mellon University in 1991. This dissertation won him the Alexander Henderson Award for excellence in economics, an award also won by Nobel Laureates Oliver Williamson, Dale T. Mortensen, Finn Kydland and Edward Prescott. After earning his PhD he became an assistant professor at the University of California at San Diego, where he was a professor from 2001 to 2004. At the beginning of 2003 he moved back to Europe and became a professor of economics at London Business School. In 2006 he received a VICI award and became a professor of economics at the University of Amsterdam. He has been a visiting professor at the University of Rochester and the Wharton School and also a visiting scholar at the European Central Bank, the Board of Governors of the Federal Reserve System in Washington DC, and several regional Federal Reserve Banks. He is a fellow of the European Economic Association.

== Research interests ==
Uncertainty and forward-looking agents play a crucial role in modern macroeconomics and Wouter den Haan helped in making it feasible to analyze models with these features by developing computer algorithms to solve these models. Together with Albert Marcet he developed the Parameterized Expectations Algorithm (PEA) and the “Denhaan-Marcet statistic” is used to evaluate the accuracy of numerical solutions. His more recent work deals with solving macroeconomic models in which heterogeneity and contracting issues play a key role.

The key theme in Wouter den Haan's research is the idea that to understand macroeconomic fluctuations one has to understand how transactions take place at the micro level. In particular, it is important to understand how agents find each other (and in particular what the search costs are and how long it takes), what agents know about each other (and in particular whether there are informational asymmetries), and what kind of contracts agents can write. The importance of these “frictions” for macroeconomics has been understood for quite some time but only recently do we have the computational tools to analyze macroeconomic models that are buildup from non-trivial micro foundations.

Wouter den Haan has applied this theme both to labour and financial markets. His research has shown that a job-market matching model is very helpful in accounting for the high unemployment rates in several European countries. In particular, his research makes clear that the Growth and Stability pact—by keeping tax rates high until the number of unemployment has actually dropped—may make it more difficult to move towards the better equilibrium of low unemployment rates.

His work on the role of frictions in financial markets has shown how initially small shocks can lead to large fluctuations because of the feedback effects between the destruction of relationships of lending institutions and their clients and the amount that investors want to provide to these lending institutions. His research on financial markets also looks at the effects that changes in the interest rate by the central bank has on the economy. His recent work shows both empirically and theoretically that frictions between banks and consumers may actually be more important for economic fluctuations than frictions between banks and firms.

== Teaching ==
In 2007 and 2012, Wouter den Haan won the Tinbergen Institute Teacher of the Year Award. According to a statement on the official Tinbergen Institute, "Students sincerely appreciate the effort he put into his courses and the MPhil sequence of macroeconomics courses in general." In 2012, he won the LSE Department of Economics Best Supervisor Award.
