= Indivisibility of labor =

In macroeconomics, indivisibility of labor is the idea that labor cannot be used in continuous units but must be purchased from workers in blocks of time, such as eight hours a day or forty hours a week. This model can result in differences in the number of hours worked even though the workers are assumed to be identical: some workers may be unemployed while others are fully employed or even overemployed.

The opposite presumption would be that labor may be purchased in continuous units, that workers are identical, and workers' utility functions as concave in leisure and income. Under this model, an optimal outcome is for all workers to work some of the time: all workers are at least partially employed and none are unemployed.

== Selling ==
Labor is sold in blocks rather than in continuous units because there are fixed costs to the employer attributable to each employee and fixed costs to the employee attributable to each employer.

The concept of labor as indivisible has been introduced by Richard Rogerson and Gary Hansen, the latter of who describes wages as "lumpy" in an attempt to supplement real business cycle theory. Because costs occur in lumps, there is unemployment. It has since then been used in variety of economic theories, especially in real business cycle theory.
