= Gary Hanson =

Gary Hanson may refer to:

== Hanson ==
- Gary D. Hanson (born 1949), former Democratic member of the South Dakota Senate
- Gary W. Hanson (born 1950), South Dakota Public Utilities Commissioner and former Republican member of the South Dakota Senate

== Hansen ==
- Gary Hansen (born c. 1958), American macroeconomist
- Gary Hansen (politician) (born c. 1943), American politician in Oregon
