= Representative agent =

Economists use the term representative agent to refer to the typical decision-maker of a certain type (for example, the typical consumer, or the typical firm).

More technically, an economic model is said to have a representative agent if all agents of the same type are identical. Also, economists sometimes say a model has a representative agent when agents differ, but act in such a way that the sum of their choices is mathematically equivalent to the decision of one individual or many identical individuals. This occurs, for example, when preferences are Gorman aggregable. A model that contains many different agents whose choices cannot be aggregated in this way is called a heterogeneous agent model.

The notion of the representative agent can be traced back to the late 19th century. Francis Edgeworth (1881) used the term "representative particular", while Alfred Marshall (1890) introduced a "representative firm" in his Principles of Economics. However, after Robert Lucas, Jr.'s critique of econometric policy evaluation spurred the development of microfoundations for macroeconomics, the notion of the representative agent became more prominent and more controversial. Many macroeconomic models today are characterized by an explicitly stated optimization problem of the representative agent, which may be either a consumer or a producer (or, frequently, both types of representative agents are present). The derived individual demand or supply curves are then used as the corresponding aggregate demand or supply curves. Since it has been shown that the commonly used demand functions do not aggregate to representative agents, the implications of representative agents models need not, and are unlikely to, hold for individual consumers.

== Motivation ==
When economists study a representative agent, this is because it is usually simpler to consider a single 'typical' decision maker instead of simultaneously analyzing many different decisions. Of course, economists must abandon the representative agent assumption when differences between individuals are central to the question at hand. For example, a macroeconomist might analyze the impact of a rise of oil prices on a typical 'representative' consumer; but some analyses of auctions involve heterogeneous agent models because competing potential buyers can value the good differently.

Hartley (1997) discusses the reasons for the prominence of representative agent modelling in contemporary macroeconomics. The Lucas critique (1976) pointed out that policy recommendations based on observed past macroeconomic relationships may neglect subsequent behavioral changes by economic agents, which, when added up, would change the macroeconomic relationships themselves. He argued that this problem would be avoided in models that explicitly described the decision-making situation of the individual agent. In such a model, an economist could analyze a policy change by recalculating the decision problem of each agent under the new policy, then aggregating these decisions to calculate the macroeconomic effects of the change.

Lucas' influential argument convinced many macroeconomists to build microfounded models of this kind. However, this was technically more difficult than earlier modelling strategies. Therefore, almost all the earliest general equilibrium macroeconomic models were simplified by assuming that consumers and/or firms could be described as a representative agent. General equilibrium models with many heterogeneous agents are much more complex, and are therefore still a relatively new field of economic research.

== Critique ==
Hartley, however, finds these reasons for representative agent modelling unconvincing. Kirman too, is critical of the representative agent approach in economics. Because representative agent models simply ignore valid aggregation concerns, they sometimes commit the so-called fallacy of composition. He provides an example in which the representative agent disagrees with all individuals in the economy. Policy recommendations to improve the welfare of the representative agent would be illegitimate in this case. Kirman concludes that the reduction of a group of heterogeneous agents to a representative agent is not just an analytical convenience, but it is "both unjustified and leads to conclusions which are usually misleading and often wrong." In his view, the representative agent "deserves a decent burial, as an approach to economic analysis that is not only primitive, but fundamentally erroneous."

A possible alternative to the representative agent approach to economics could be agent-based simulation models which are capable of dealing with many heterogeneous agents. Another alternative is to construct dynamic stochastic general equilibrium (DSGE) models with heterogeneous agents, which is difficult, but is becoming more common (Ríos-Rull, 1995; Heathcote, Storesletten, and Violante 2009; Canova 2007 section 2.1.2).

Chang, Kim, and Schorfheide (2011) make a point similar to that of Kirman, in the context of a DSGE model where agents are heterogeneous because of uninsured labor income risk. They estimate a representative-agent DSGE model on the basis of the aggregate data implied by their heterogeneous-agent economy, and show that the estimated coefficients are inconsistent with the true parameters of the heterogeneous economy. They point out that

Since it is not always feasible to account for heterogeneity explicitly, it is important to recognize the possibility that the parameters of a highly-aggregated model may not be invariant with respect to policy changes.

Jackson and Yariv (2017) prove that representative agents for commonly used utility functions do not exist, and thereby typical macroeconomic models are not actually micro-founded.

== See also ==
- Agent (economics)
- Homo economicus
- Aggregate demand
- Aggregation problem
- Methodological individualism
