= SDGE =

SDGE is an acronym from the following:

- Stochastic dynamic general equilibrium, a method in macroeconomics.
- San Diego Gas and Electric, a utility firm in California.
