= Welfare cost of inflation =

In macroeconomics, the welfare cost of inflation comprises the changes in social welfare caused by inflation.

The traditional approach, developed by Bailey (1956) and Friedman (1969), treats real money balances as a consumption good and inflation as a tax on real balances. This approach measures the welfare cost by computing the appropriate area under the money demand curve. Fischer (1981) and Lucas (1981), find the cost of inflation to be low. Fischer computes the deadweight loss generated by an increase in inflation from zero to 10 percent as just 0.3 percent of GDP using the monetary base as the definition of money. Lucas places the cost of a 10 percent inflation at 0.45 percent of GDP using M1 as the measure of money. Lucas (2000) revised his estimate upward, to slightly less than 1 percent of GDP. Ireland (2009) extends this line of analysis to study the recent behavior of U.S. money demand.

Structural models are a recent alternative to econometric estimates of the triangle under an estimated money demand curve. Cooley and Hansen (1989) calibrate a cash-in-advance version of a business cycle model. They find that the welfare cost of 10 percent inflation is about 0.4 percent of GNP.

Craig and Rocheteau (2008) argue that a search-theoretic framework is necessary for appropriately measuring the welfare cost of inflation. Lagos and Wright (2005) model monetary exchange and provide estimates for the annual cost of 10 percent inflation to be between 3 and 4 percent of GDP.

== See also ==
- Welfare cost of business cycles
