= Senator Hanson =

Senator Hanson may refer to:

- Alexander Contee Hanson (1786–1819), U.S. Senator for Maryland
- Frank H. Hanson (1884–1940), Wisconsin State Senate
- Gary D. Hanson (born 1949), South Dakota Senate
- Gary W. Hanson (born 1950), South Dakota Senate
- John Hanson (Liberian politician) (died c. 1860) Liberian Senate
- Marv Hanson (1943–2004), Minnesota State Senate
- Paula Hanson (born 1944), Minnesota State Senate
- Pauline Hanson (born 1954), Australian Senate
- Peter E. Hanson (1845–1914), Minnesota State Senate
- Roger L. Hanson (1925–2005), Minnesota State Senate

== See also ==
- Sarah Hanson-Young (born 1981), Australian Senate
- Senator Hansen (disambiguation)
