= Senator Hansen =

Senator Hansen may refer to:

- Bill Hansen (politician) (born 1931), Iowa State Senate
- Clifford Hansen (1912–2009), Wisconsin State Senate
- Dave Hansen (born 1947), Michigan State Senate
- Goeff Hansen (born 1959), Nevada State Senate
- Ira Hansen (born 1960), Montana State Senate
- Ken Hansen (born 1951), Nebraska State Senate
- Matt Hansen (born 1988), Idaho State Senate
- Orval Hansen (1926–2017), Idaho State Senate
- Stephanie Hansen (born 1961), Delaware State Senate
- Tom Hansen (Nebraska politician) (born 1946), Nebraska State Senate
- Tom Hansen (South Dakota politician) (born 1939), South Dakota State Senate
- William C. Hansen (1891–1983), Wisconsin State Senate

== See also ==
- Senator Hanson (disambiguation)
