= Richard Rogerson =

American economist

Academic background
- Education: University of Alberta B.Sc. University of Minnesota Ph.D.
- Doctoral advisor: Edward C. Prescott

Academic work
- Discipline: Macroeconomics
- Institutions: University of Rochester; New York University; Stanford University; University of Minnesota; University of Pennsylvania; Arizona State University; Princeton University

Richard Donald Rogerson is an American economist who is currently the Charles and Marie Robertson Professor of Public and International Affairs at Princeton University, where he is also the Director of the Louis A. Simpson Center for the Study of Macroeconomics.

== Education ==
Rogerson graduated from the University of Alberta with a B.Sc. in physics in 1979 and received his Ph.D. in economics from the University of Minnesota in 1984. At Minnesota, Rogerson's dissertation advisor was the future Nobel Laureate in Economics Edward C. Prescott.

== Career ==
Rogerson was an assistant professor of economics at University of Rochester from 1984 to 1987, an assistant professor of economics at New York University from 1987 to 1988, and an assistant professor of economics at Stanford University from 1988 to 1991.

He was later an associate professor of economics at University of Minnesota from 1991 to 1997, after which he was a professor of economics at University of Pennsylvania from 1997 to 2001.

In 2001, Rogerson was named the Rondthaler Professor of Economics at Arizona State University, where he was also Regents Professor from 2007 to 2011. Rogerson joined the faculty at Princeton University in 2011.
