= Gary Hansen =

American economist

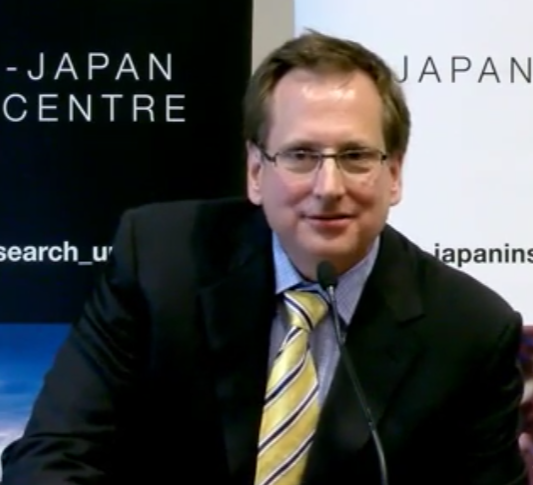
- At an ANU panel discussion in 2018
- Born: c. 1958
- Education: University of Puget Sound; University of Minnesota
- Occupation: Macroeconomist

Gary Duane Hansen (born c. 1958) is an American macroeconomist at UCLA. He is known for creating the theory of indivisible labor, as part of this doctoral thesis at the University of Minnesota.

Hansen graduated from the University of Puget Sound in 1980 and received his doctorate from the University of Minnesota, under supervision of Edward Prescott, in 1986.

== Selected publications ==
- "Fiscal Reform and Government Debt in Japan: A Neoclassical Perspective"
- "Health Insurance Reform: The Impact of a Medicare Buy-In" (with Minchung Hsu and Junsang Lee)
- "Business Cycle Fluctuations and the Life Cycle: How Important is On-the-Job Skill Accumulation??" with Selahattin Imrohoroglu
- "Consumption over the Life Cycle: The Role of Annuities" (with Selo Imrohoroglu)
- "Why Have Business Cycle Fluctuations Become Less Volatile?" (with Andres Arias and Lee E. Ohanian)
