= Raimondas Kuodis =

Lithuanian politician (born 1971)

Member of the Seimas
- Incumbent
- Assumed office 14 November 2024

Personal details
- Born: 1 August 1971 (age 54)
- Party: Homeland Union

Raimondas Kuodis (born 1 August 1971) is a Lithuanian economist and politician of the Homeland Union serving as a member of the Seimas since 2024. From 2011 to 2023, he served as deputy chairman of the Bank of Lithuania.
