= Ricardo Reis =

Ricardo Reis may refer to:

- Ricardo Reis (economist), Portuguese economist
- Ricardo Reis (heteronym), heteronym of the Portuguese poet Fernando Pessoa
- Ricardo Reis (politician), Portuguese politician

== See also ==
- The Year of the Death of Ricardo Reis, a 1984 novel by José Saramago
