= V. V. Chari =

Indian-American economist

Varadarajan Venkata Chari
- Born: January 1, 1952; India

Academic background
- Education: Indian Institute of Technology, Bombay; Carnegie Mellon University

Academic work
- Discipline: Macroeconomics, Public Economics, Monetary Economics
- Institutions: University of Minnesota
- Notable works: Business Cycle Accounting
- Awards: Fellow of the Econometric Society (1998)

Varadarajan Venkata Chari (born c. 1952) is an Indian-American economist and professor of economics, currently teaches macroeconomic theory, public economics, and monetary economics at the University of Minnesota's College of Liberal Arts.

Chari received a Bachelor of Technology in Chemical Engineering from the Indian Institute of Technology, Bombay in 1974, and was a production engineer at Union Carbide (India) Limited from 1974 to 1976.

Chari then received his M.S. in economics in 1978 from Carnegie Mellon University and subsequently followed up with his Ph.D. from Carnegie Mellon University in 1980. His dissertation won him the Alexander Henderson Award for excellence in economics, an award also won by Nobel Laureates Oliver E. Williamson, Dale T. Mortensen, Finn E. Kydland and Edward C. Prescott.

Chari joined the Kellogg School of Management, Northwestern University as an assistant professor of managerial economics. In 1986, he moved to the Federal Reserve Bank of Minneapolis. In 1992 he returned to the Kellogg Graduate School of Management and then moved back to Minneapolis and the University of Minnesota in the fall of 1994. At the University of Minnesota, Chari has held many titles ranging from Paul Grenzel Land Grant Professor, to Director of the Heller-Hurwicz Economics Institute (2010–2016), and Chair of University of Minnesota's Department of Economics.

His research interests are in banking, fiscal and monetary policy and in issues of economic development. He has written extensively on banking crises, exchange rate fluctuations and international capital flows. Additionally, he has held associate editor positions for American Economics Journal (since 2008) and the Journal of Economic Theory (since 1998).

Dr. Chari is also a fellow of the Econometric Society since 1999 and recipient of the Census Bureau Research Grant since 2005.
