= Overheating (economics) =

Economic concept

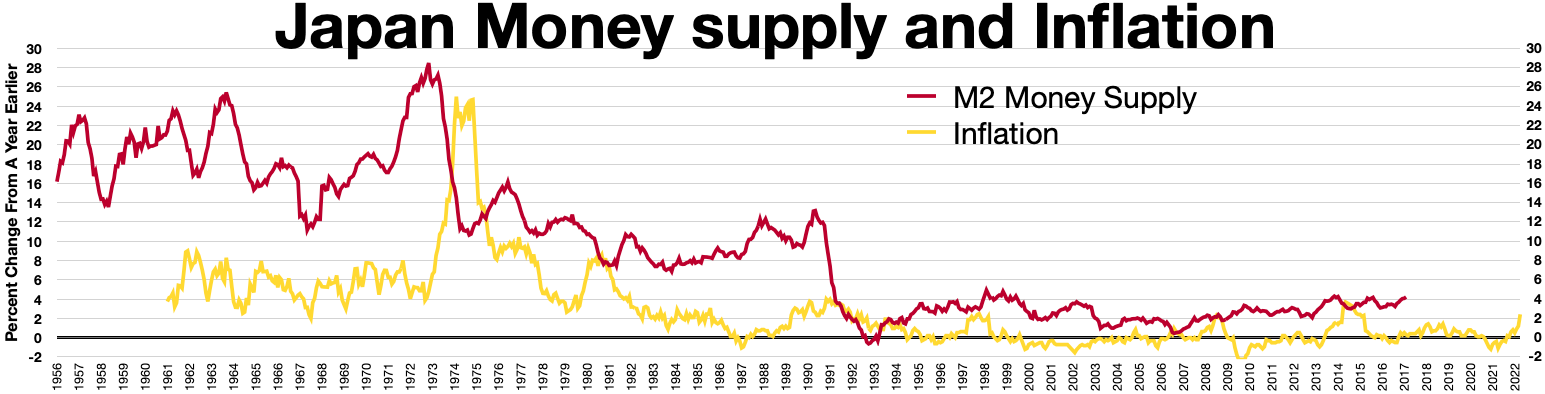
Japan money supply and inflation (year over year) M2 money supply Inflation

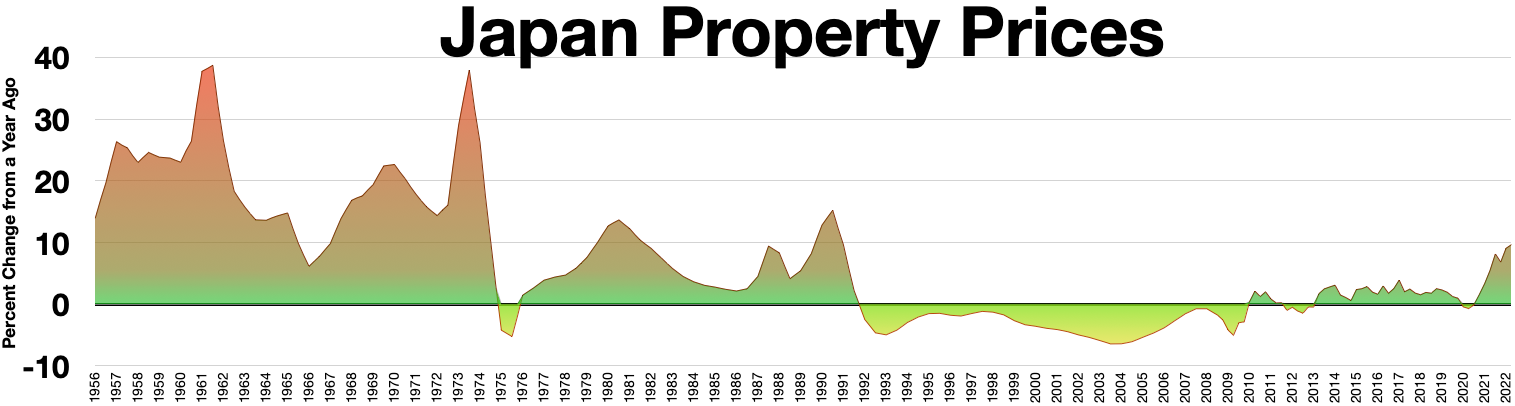
Japan property prices (year over year)

Overheating of an economy occurs when its productive capacity is unable to keep pace with growing aggregate demand. It is generally characterised by an above-average rate of economic growth, where growth is occurring at an unsustainable rate. Boom periods are often characterised by overheating in the economy. An economy is said to be overheated when producers are not able to supply all the goods that consumers demand. The main reason behind overheating is insufficient supply allocation because of excess spending by the people due to increase in consumer wealth.

== Causes ==
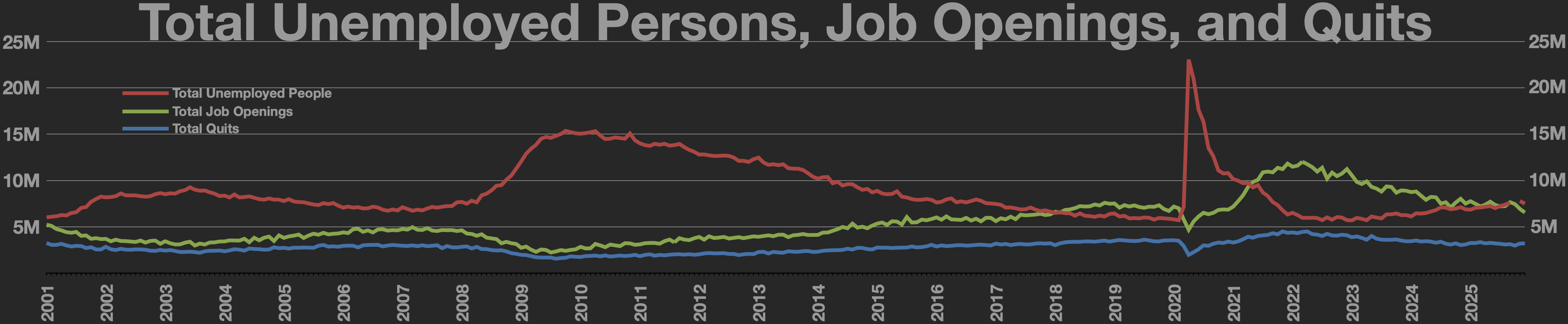
US labor market Total unemployed people Total job openings Total quits

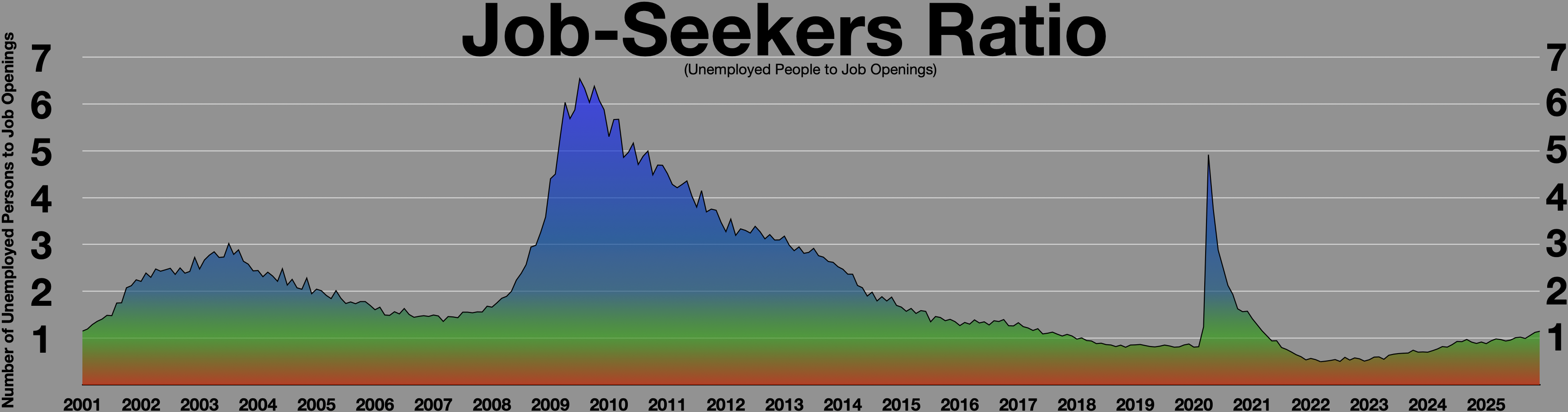
Job seekers ratio United States Cold job market Balanced job market Hot job market

High levels of aggregate demand tend to be the cause of overheating. If short run aggregate demand exceeds long run aggregate supply, then the excess demand for goods must be met via the over-employment of resources. This may be achieved by employing workers for extra shifts or using machinery beyond their recommended working hours. This type of production is considered unsustainable because the over-employment cannot be supported indefinitely. Overheating can be prevented by means of constant infrastructure expansion to eliminate bottlenecks.

== Effects ==
Overheating is generally preceded by lower than average economic growth. Demand pull inflation occurs as suppliers try to capitalize on the excess demand which cannot be met via existing production constraints. These higher prices tend to reduce aggregate demand and exports (since goods and services become more expensive abroad) leading to reduced consumption. Central banks often simultaneously tighten monetary policy in response to increased inflationary pressures, reducing investment expenditure, which in tandem with decreased consumption, can lead to economic recession.

== Historical instances ==
- The Lawson Boom of the late 1980s/early 90s in the UK
- Switzerland during the periods of 1962–1967, 1971–1974, 1988–1991
- Imperial Iran during the Pahlavi dynasty from 1974 to 1978

== See also ==
- Economic bubble
- Greenspan put
- Hyperinflation
- Roaring Twenties
- 1970s commodities boom
