= Gary D. Hanson =

American politician

Member of the South Dakota Senate from the 1st district
- In office 2004–2010

Personal details
- Born: December 17, 1949 (age 76) Sisseton, South Dakota
- Party: Democratic
- Spouse: Angela
- Occupation: farmer/rancher

Gary D. Hanson (born December 17, 1949) is an American politician who served as a Democratic member of the South Dakota Senate, representing the 1st district from 2004 to 2010. Previously, he was a member of the South Dakota House of Representatives from 1998 to 2004.
