= Finn E. Kydland =

Norwegian economist and Nobel Laureate (born 1943)

Finn Erling Kydland
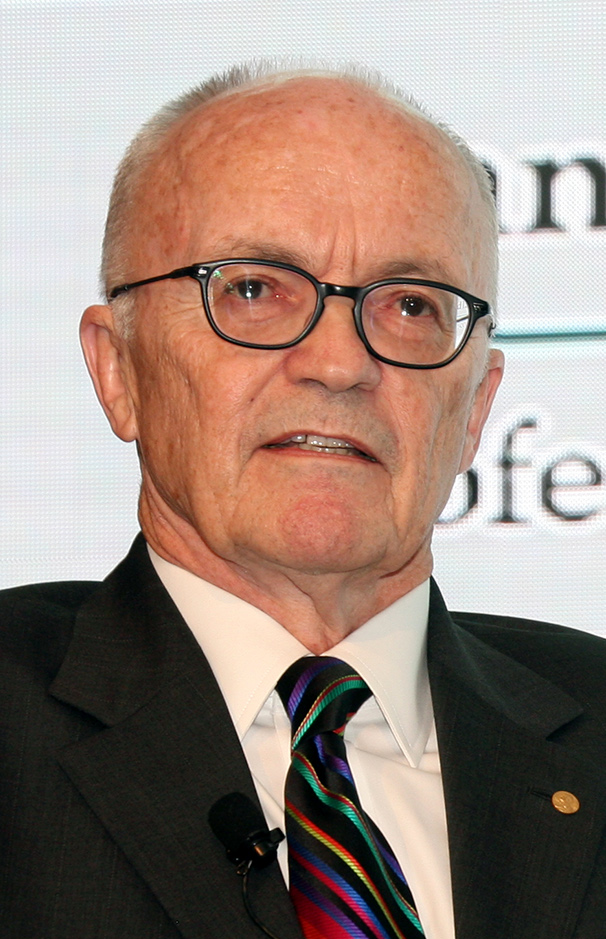
- Kydland in 2015
- Born: 1 December 1943 (age 82); Ålgård, Gjestal Municipality, Norway

Academic background
- Alma mater: Norwegian School of Economics (BSc); Carnegie Mellon University (PhD)
- Thesis: Decentralized Macroeconomic Planning (1973)
- Doctoral advisor: Edward C. Prescott; David Cass
- Influences: Robert S. Kaplan

Academic work
- Discipline: Macroeconomics
- School or tradition: New classical economics
- Notable ideas: Real Business Cycle Theory; Time consistency in economic policy
- Awards: Nobel Memorial Prize in Economics, 2004
- Website: Information at IDEAS / RePEc

Finn Erling Kydland (born 1 December 1943) is a Norwegian economist known for his contributions to business cycle theory. He is the Henley Professor of Economics at the University of California, Santa Barbara. He is also University Professor of Economics and Richard P. Simmons Distinguished Professor Emeritus at the Tepper School of Business of Carnegie Mellon University, where he earned his PhD, and has a part-time position at the Norwegian School of Economics (NHH). Kydland was a co-recipient of the 2004 Nobel Memorial Prize in Economics, with Edward C. Prescott, "for their contributions to dynamic macroeconomics: the time consistency of economic policy and the driving forces behind business cycles."

== Biography ==
=== Early years ===
Kydland grew up as the eldest of six siblings at the family farm at Søyland in Gjestal Municipality, which is located in the Jæren farming region in Rogaland county, southwestern Norway. He recalls having had a liberal upbringing, his parents not imposing many limitations on their children. Finn Kydland became interested in mathematics and economics as a young adult, after he did some bookkeeping at a friend's mink farm.

With a freshly awakened interest in theoretical economics, Kydland earned a BSc from the Norwegian School of Economics (NHH) in 1968 and a PhD in economics from Carnegie Mellon in 1973, dissertation: Decentralized Macroeconomic Planning, supervised by Edward C. Prescott. After his PhD he returned to NHH as an assistant professor. In 1978 he moved back to Carnegie Mellon as an associate professor. He has been living in the United States since then.

=== Scholarship ===
Kydland's areas of expertise are economics in general and political economy. His main areas of teaching and interest are business cycles, monetary and fiscal policy and labor economics. He joined the faculty of Carnegie Mellon University in 1977, where he served as a Professor of Economics until 2004, when he became a faculty member of the University of California, Santa Barbara and founded the Laboratory for Aggregate Economics and Finance (LAEF) at this same institution. He is a Research Associate for the Federal Reserve Banks of Dallas, Cleveland and St. Louis, and a Fellow at the IC² Institute at the University of Texas at Austin. He is also an adjunct professor at the Norwegian School of Economics, and has held visiting scholar and professor positions at the Hoover Institution and the Universidad Torcuato di Tella in Buenos Aires, Argentina.

=== Personal life ===
Kydland married Liv Kjellevold in 1968, with whom he had four children: Jon Martin, Eirik, Camilla, and Kari. He is now married to Tonya Schooler.

== Honours and awards ==
- Bank of Sweden Prize in Economic Sciences in Memory of Alfred Nobel (2004)
- Fellow, Econometric Society (1992–present)
- John Stauffer National Fellowship, Hoover Institution (1982–1983)
- Alexander Henderson Award, Carnegie Mellon (1973)
- Member of the Norwegian Academy of Science and Letters.
- International Chamber of Commerce Oslo Business for Peace Award 2017

Awards
Preceded by Robert F. Engle III; Clive W.J. Granger	Laureate of the Nobel Memorial Prize in Economics; 2004; Served alongside: Edward C. Prescott	Succeeded by Robert J. Aumann; Thomas C. Schelling
