= Macroeconomics =

Study of an economy as a whole

Production and national income: Macroeconomics takes a big-picture view of the entire economy, including examining the roles of, and relationships between, firms, households and governments, and the different types of markets, such as the financial market and the labour market.

Macroeconomics is a branch of economics that deals with the performance, structure, behavior, and decision-making of an economy as a whole. This includes regional, national, and global economies. Macroeconomists study aggregate measures of the economy, such as output or gross domestic product (GDP), national income, unemployment, inflation, consumption, saving, investment, or trade. Macroeconomics is primarily focused on questions that help to understand aggregate variables in relation to long-run economic growth.

Macroeconomics and microeconomics are the two most general fields in economics. Given macroeconomists focus on large-scale phenomena, or aggregate variables, they differ significantly from microeconomists who study markets and decision making at a smaller level of analysis, such as firms or consumers. This divide is institutionalized in the field of economics, given the differences in both methods and outcomes of interest.

Macroeconomics is further divided into topics based on the time frame of analysis: short-term fluctuations over the business cycle, medium-term determinants of aggregate variables, such as unemployment, that are unaffected by short-term shocks, and long-term economic growth. The field also includes analysis of monetary and fiscal policies, particularly where they target stabilization of certain indicators or the rate of economic growth.

Macroeconomics, as a separate field of research and study, is generally recognized to have begun in 1936, when John Maynard Keynes published his The General Theory of Employment, Interest and Money, but its intellectual predecessors are much older. Swedish economist Knut Wicksell wrote the book Interest and Prices (1898), translated into English in 1936, is considered to be the pioneer of macroeconomics, while Keynes who introduced national income accounting and various related concepts can be said to be the founding father of macroeconomics as a formal discipline. Since World War II, various macroeconomic schools of thought like Keynesians, monetarists, new classical and new Keynesian economists have made contributions to the development of the mainstream research.

== Basic concepts ==
Macroeconomics encompasses a variety of concepts and variables, but above all, the three central macroeconomic variables are output, unemployment, and inflation. Besides, the time horizon varies for different types of macroeconomic topics, and this distinction is crucial for many research and policy debates. A further important dimension is that of an economy's openness, economic theory distinguishing sharply between closed economies and open economies.

It is usual to distinguish between three time horizons in macroeconomics, each having its own focus on, e.g., the determination of output:

- the short run (e.g., a few years): Focus is on business cycle fluctuations and changes in aggregate demand, which often drive them. Stabilization policies like monetary policy or fiscal policy are relevant in this time frame
- the medium run (e.g., a decade): Over the medium run, the economy tends to an output level determined by supply factors like the capital stock, the technology level, and the labor force, and unemployment tends to revert to its structural (or "natural") level. These factors move slowly, so that it is a reasonable approximation to take them as given on a medium-term time scale, though labour market policies and competition policy are instruments that may influence the economy's structures and hence also the medium-run equilibrium
- the long run (e.g., a couple of decades or more): On this time scale, emphasis is on the determinants of long-run economic growth like accumulation of human and physical capital, technological innovations, and demographic changes. Potential policies to influence these developments include education reform, incentives to change saving rates, or incentives to increase R&D activities.

=== Output and income ===
National output is the total amount of everything a country produces in a given period of time. Everything that is produced and sold generates an equal amount of income. The total net output of the economy is usually measured as GDP. Adding net factor incomes from abroad to GDP produces gross national income (GNI), which measures the total income of all residents in the economy. In most countries, the difference between GDP and GNI is modest so that GDP can be treated as the total income of all inhabitants as well; however, in some countries, e.g., those with very large net foreign assets (or debt), the difference may be considerable.

Advances in technology, accumulation of machinery and other capital, and better education and human capital, are all factors that lead to increased economic output over time. However, output does not always increase consistently over time. Business cycles can cause short-term drops in output called recessions. Economists look for macroeconomic policies that prevent economies from slipping into either recessions or overheating and that lead to higher productivity levels and standards of living.

=== Unemployment ===
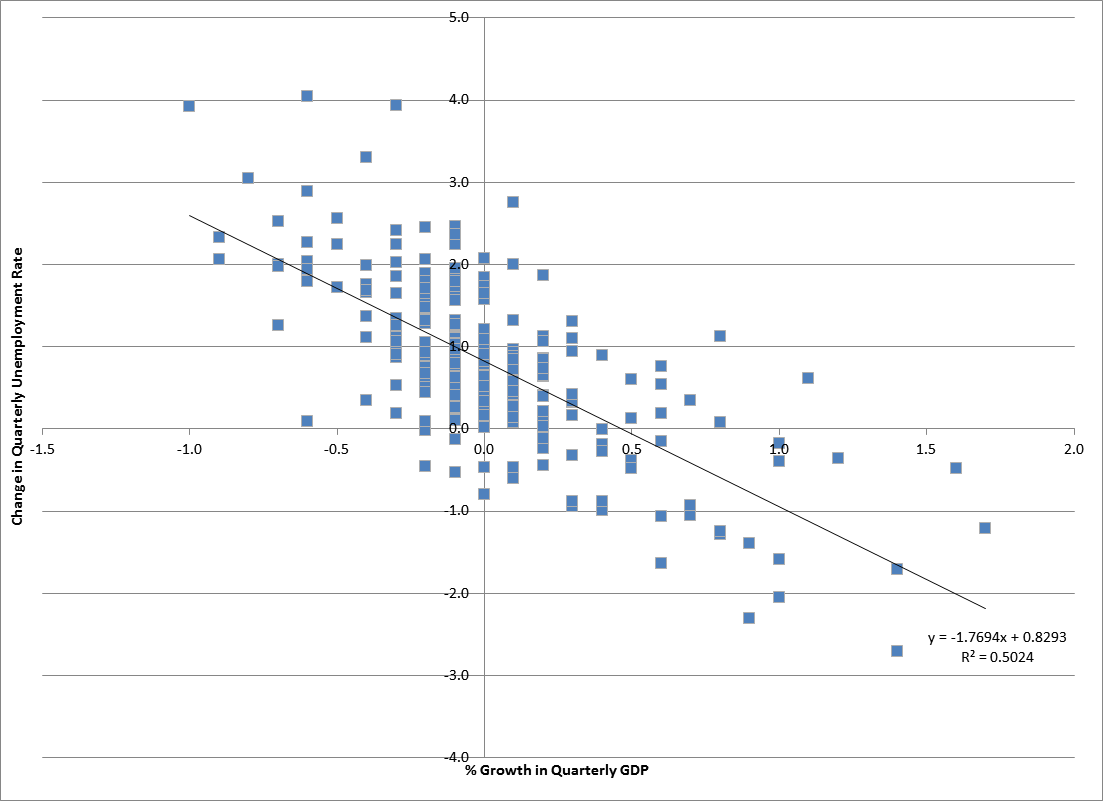
A chart using US data showing the relationship between economic growth and unemployment expressed by Okun's law. The relationship demonstrates cyclical unemployment. High short-run GDP growth leads to a lower unemployment rate.

The amount of unemployment in an economy is measured by the unemployment rate, i.e., the percentage of persons in the labor force who do not have a job, but who are actively looking for one. People who are retired, pursuing education, or discouraged from seeking work due to a lack of job prospects are not part of the labor force and, consequently, are not counted as unemployed either.

Unemployment has a short-run cyclical component which depends on the business cycle, and a more permanent structural component, which can be loosely thought of as the average unemployment rate in an economy over extended periods, and which is often termed the natural or structural rate of unemployment.

Cyclical unemployment occurs when growth stagnates. Okun's law represents the empirical relationship between unemployment and short-run GDP growth. The original version of Okun's law states that a 3% increase in output would lead to a 1% decrease in unemployment.

The structural or natural rate of unemployment is the level of unemployment that will occur in a medium-run equilibrium, i.e., a situation with a cyclical unemployment rate of zero. There may be several reasons why there is some positive unemployment level even in a cyclically neutral situation, which all have their foundation in some market failure:

- Search unemployment (also called frictional unemployment) occurs when workers and firms are heterogeneous, and there is imperfect information, generally causing a time-consuming search and matching process when filling a job vacancy in a firm, during which the prospective worker will often be unemployed. Sectoral shifts and other reasons for a changed demand from firms for workers with particular skills and characteristics, which occur continually in a changing economy, may also cause more search unemployment because of increased mismatch.
- Efficiency wage models are labor market models in which firms choose not to lower wages to the level where supply equals demand because the lower wages would lower employees' efficiency levels
- Trade unions, which are important actors in the labor market in some countries, may exercise market power to keep wages over the market-clearing level for the benefit of their members, even at the cost of some unemployment
- Legal minimum wages may prevent the wage from falling to a market-clearing level, causing unemployment among low-skilled (and low-paid) workers. In the case of employers having some monopsony power, however, employment effects may have the opposite sign.

=== Inflation and deflation ===
Changes in the ten-year moving averages of price level and growth in money supply (using the measure of M2, the supply of hard currency and money held in most types of bank accounts) in the US from 1880 to 2016. Over the long run, the two series show a clear positive correlation.

A general price increase across the entire economy is called inflation. When prices decrease, there is deflation. Economists measure these changes in prices with price indexes. Inflation will rise when an economy overheats and grows too quickly. Similarly, a declining economy can lead to decreasing inflation and, in some cases, deflation.

Changes in the inflation rate may result from several factors. Too much aggregate demand in the economy will cause an overheating, raising inflation rates via the Phillips curve because of a tight labor market leading to large wage increases which will be transmitted to increases in the price of the products of employers. Too little aggregate demand will have the opposite effect of creating more unemployment and lower wages, thereby decreasing inflation. Aggregate supply shocks will also affect inflation, e.g., the oil crises of the 1970s and the 2021–2023 global energy crisis. Changes in inflation may also impact the formation of inflation expectations, creating a self-fulfilling inflationary or deflationary spiral.

The monetarist quantity theory of money holds that changes in the price level are directly caused by changes in the money supply. Central bankers conducting monetary policy usually have as a main priority to avoid too high inflation, typically by adjusting interest rates. High inflation, as well as deflation, can lead to increased uncertainty and other negative consequences, particularly when inflation (or deflation) is unexpected. Consequently, most central banks aim for a positive, but stable and not very high inflation level.

Whereas there is empirical evidence that there is a long-run positive correlation between the growth rate of the money stock and the rate of inflation, the quantity theory has proved unreliable in the short- and medium-run time horizon relevant to monetary policy and is abandoned as a practical guideline by most central banks today.

=== GDP Measurement ===
==== Equation Using Expenditure Approach ====
One way to capture GDP, or total net output, is the expenditure method. The expenditure approach requires aggregating four main components of spending: consumer spending (CS) government spending (GS), investment (IS), and net exports (EXP-IMP). CS is composed of household purchases of goods and services, including investments in residential housing. GS is government spending on goods and services, particularly in areas such as education, the military, and other public infrastructure. While transfer payments, which include things like welfare or social security payments, are paid by the government, they are not included in the final calculation of the expenditure approach because they are not a final good or service. IS is all spending by businesses on physical capital or equipment, as well as labor, in the service of goods and service production. Finally, net exports capture a country's trade balance: total exports are goods and services a country sells abroad, and imports are goods and services purchased domestically from abroad.

Represented as an equation, GDP is:

$GDP = CS + GS + IS + (EXP-IMP)$

==== GDP Deflator ====
Macroeconomists are also interested in measuring GDP independent of inflation. Because inflation reflects relative changes in prices, the expenditure method may misattribute increased spending on goods and services to growth when it is driven by relative price changes rather than by a change in total quantity. To parse out these effects, the GDP deflator is a measurement of the relative difference in real vs. nominal GDP, giving us the size of inflation adjustment for a given year.

$GDP^{adj} = (GDP^{ nom} /GDP^{ real}) \cdot 100$

Where the term $GDP^{ nom}$ captures nominal GDP, or the standard measure of the total value of goods and services in a given year at that year's prices. $GDP^{ real}$ captures real GDP, or the inflation-adjusted measure of all goods and services produced in the economy.

A GDP deflator of 100 indicates neither inflation nor deflation. When the value exceeds 100, it indicates price inflation in the economy. Conversely, a GDP deflator below 100 indicates deflation.

=== Measuring the supply of money ===
Two common ways of determining the total money supply in an economy are M1 and M2. M2 consists of M1 plus a few other things. M1 is money that is liquid. Liquid refers to a financial asset that can be quickly converted into cash without significant loss of value. This obviously includes cash, coins, checking account deposits, and similar items. M2, however, includes time deposits, saving accounts, and money market mutual funds, which are not as liquid, in its measurement. It is important to understand the money supply, as it affects interest rates and plays a central role in monetary policy.

The money multiplier equation shows how a bank can expand the money supply by taking in deposits and making loans. The money supply reserve multiplier equation is:

Money multiplier = 1 / reserve requirement ratio

The reserve requirement in this equation represents the proportion of deposits that the bank must keep in reserve to meet customer withdrawals. That proportion of money is based on the deposits made at the bank. So, if the reserve requirement is .20 (20%), then the money multiplier is five. This means that a $5 deposit would lead to a $25 increase in the money supply. This is because of the cycle in which the bank keeps a portion of the deposit (in our example, 20%) and lends out the remainder each time. These new spendable bank deposits are counted in the money supply even though the amount of physical currency did not change. So, while the physical amount of currency would still be $5, the amount of spendable money would be $25.

=== Open economies ===
Open economy macroeconomics deals with the consequences of international trade in goods, financial assets, and possibly factor markets such as labor migration and the international relocation of firms (physical capital). It explores what determines import, export, the balance of trade, and over longer horizons, the accumulation of net foreign assets. An important topic is the role of exchange rates and the pros and cons of maintaining a fixed exchange rate system or even a currency union like the Economic and Monetary Union of the European Union, drawing on the research literature on optimum currency areas.

== History ==
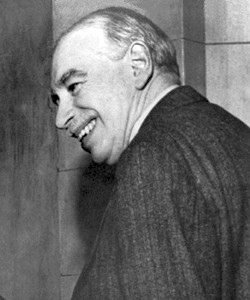
John Maynard Keynes is considered the initiator of macroeconomics when he published his work The General Theory of Employment, Interest, and Money in 1936.

Macroeconomics, as a separate field of research and study, is generally recognized to have begun with the publication of John Maynard Keynes's The General Theory of Employment, Interest, and Money in 1936. The terms "macrodynamics" and "macroanalysis" were introduced by Ragnar Frisch in 1933, and Lawrence Klein in 1946 used the word "macroeconomics" itself in a journal title in 1946. But naturally, several of the themes which are central to macroeconomic research had been discussed by thoughtful economists and other writers long before 1936.

=== Before Keynes ===
In particular, macroeconomic questions before Keynes were the topic of the two long-standing traditions of business cycle theory and monetary theory. William Stanley Jevons was one of the pioneers of the first tradition, whereas the quantity theory of money, labelled the oldest surviving theory in economics, as an example of the second was described already in the 16th century by Martín de Azpilcueta and later discussed by personalities like John Locke and David Hume. In the first decades of the 20th century, monetary theory was dominated by the eminent economists Alfred Marshall, Knut Wicksell, and Irving Fisher.

=== Keynes and Keynesian economics ===
When the Great Depression struck, the reigning economists had difficulty explaining how goods could go unsold and workers could be left unemployed. In the prevailing neoclassical economics paradigm, prices and wages would fall until the market cleared, with all goods and labor sold. Keynes, in his main work, the General Theory, initiated what is known as the Keynesian Revolution. He offered a new interpretation of events and a whole intellectual framework - a novel theory of economics that explained why markets might not clear, which would evolve into a school of thought known as Keynesian economics, also called Keynesianism or Keynesian theory.

In Keynes' theory, aggregate demand - by Keynes called "effective demand" - was key to determining output. Even if Keynes conceded that output might eventually return to a medium-run equilibrium (or "potential") level, the process would be slow at best. Keynes coined the term liquidity preference (his preferred name for what is also known as money demand) and explained how monetary policy might affect aggregate demand, at the same time offering clear policy recommendations for an active role of fiscal policy in stabilizing aggregate demand and hence output and employment. In addition, he explained how the multiplier effect would magnify a small decrease in consumption or investment, causing declines throughout the economy, and noted the role that uncertainty and animal spirits can play.

The generation following Keynes combined the macroeconomics of the General Theory with neoclassical microeconomics to create the neoclassical synthesis. By the 1950s, most economists had accepted the synthesis view of the macroeconomy. Economists like Paul Samuelson, Franco Modigliani, James Tobin, and Robert Solow developed formal Keynesian models and contributed formal theories of consumption, investment, and money demand that fleshed out the Keynesian framework.

=== Austrian perspective ===
Friedrich Hayek, building on Ludwig von Mises' earlier the Theory of Money and Credit following the Austrian school, developed a rival theory of the business cycle, critiquing Keynes' A Treatise on Money. Hayek did not directly rebut the General Theory, instead refined capital theory. However, Keynes' framework dominated the post-war macroeconomics. Hayek received the 1974 Nobel Memorial Prize in Economic Sciences in part for his work on capital and business cycle theory.

=== Monetarism ===
Milton Friedman updated the quantity theory of money to include a role for money demand. He argued that the role of money in the economy was sufficient to explain the Great Depression, and that aggregate-demand-oriented explanations were unnecessary. Friedman also argued that monetary policy was more effective than fiscal policy; however, Friedman doubted the government's ability to "fine-tune" the economy with monetary policy. He generally favored a policy of steady growth in the money supply rather than frequent intervention.

Friedman also challenged the original simple Phillips curve relationship between inflation and unemployment. Friedman and Edmund Phelps (who was not a monetarist) proposed an "augmented" version of the Phillips curve that excluded the possibility of a stable, long-run tradeoff between inflation and unemployment. When the oil shocks of the 1970s created a high unemployment and high inflation, Friedman and Phelps were vindicated. Monetarism was particularly influential in the early 1980s, but fell out of favor when central banks found the results disappointing when trying to target money supply instead of interest rates as monetarists recommended, concluding that the relationships between money growth, inflation, and real GDP growth are too unstable to be useful in practical monetary policy making.

=== New classical economics ===
New classical macroeconomics further challenged the Keynesian school. A central development in new classical thought came with Robert Lucas's introduction of rational expectations into macroeconomics. Before Lucas, economists had generally used adaptive expectations, in which agents were assumed to look at the recent past to form expectations about the future. Under rational expectations, agents are assumed to be more sophisticated. Consumers will not simply assume a 2% inflation rate just because that has been the average the past few years; they will look at current monetary policy and economic conditions to make an informed forecast. In the new classical models with rational expectations, monetary policy only had a limited impact.

Lucas also made an influential critique of Keynesian empirical models. He argued that forecasting models based on empirical relationships would continue to produce the same predictions even as the underlying data-generating model changed. He advocated models based on fundamental economic theory (i.e., having an explicit microeconomic foundation) that would, in principle, be structurally accurate as economies changed.

Following Lucas's critique, new classical economists, led by Edward C. Prescott and Finn E. Kydland, developed real business cycle (RBC) models of the macroeconomy. RBC models were created by combining fundamental equations from neo-classical microeconomics to make quantitative models. To generate macroeconomic fluctuations, RBC models explained recessions and unemployment as changes in technology rather than in the markets for goods or money. Critics of RBC models argue that technological changes, which typically diffuse slowly throughout the economy, could hardly generate the large short-run output fluctuations that we observe. In addition, there is strong empirical evidence that monetary policy does affect real economic activity, and the idea that technological regress can explain recent recessions seems implausible.

Despite criticism of the realism in the RBC models, they have been very influential in economic methodology by providing the first examples of general equilibrium models based on microeconomic foundations and a specification of underlying shocks that aim to explain the main features of macroeconomic fluctuations, not only qualitatively, but also quantitatively. In this way, they were forerunners of the later DSGE models.

=== New Keynesian response ===
New Keynesian economists responded to the new classical school by adopting rational expectations and focusing on developing microfounded models immune to the Lucas critique. Like classical models, new classical models assumed that prices would adjust perfectly and that monetary policy would only lead to price changes. New Keynesian models investigated sources of sticky prices and wages due to imperfect competition, which would not adjust, allowing monetary policy to impact quantities instead of prices. Stanley Fischer and John B. Taylor produced early work in this area by showing that monetary policy could be effective even in rational-expectations models when contracts locked in workers' wages. Other new Keynesian economists, including Olivier Blanchard, Janet Yellen, Julio Rotemberg, Greg Mankiw, David Romer, and Michael Woodford, expanded on this work and demonstrated other cases where various market imperfections caused inflexible prices and wages leading in turn to monetary and fiscal policy having real effects. Other researchers focused on imperfections in labor markets, developing models of efficiency wages or search and matching (SAM) models, or imperfections in credit markets like Ben Bernanke.

By the late 1990s, economists had reached a rough consensus. The market imperfections and nominal rigidities of new Keynesian theory were combined with rational expectations and the RBC methodology to produce a new and popular type of models called dynamic stochastic general equilibrium (DSGE) models. The fusion of elements from different schools of thought has been dubbed the new neoclassical synthesis. These models are now used by many central banks and are a core part of contemporary macroeconomics.

=== 2008 financial crisis ===
The 2008 financial crisis and the subsequent Great Recession were the first events to lead to a major reassessment of macroeconomics. This field had generally neglected the specific role of financial institutions in the economy. After the crisis, macroeconomic researchers have turned their attention to several new directions:

- the financial system and the nature of macro-financial linkages and frictions, studying leverage, liquidity and complexity problems in the financial sector, the use of macroprudential tools and the dangers of an unsustainable public debt,
- increased emphasis on empirical work as part of the so-called credibility revolution in economics, using improved methods to distinguish between correlation and causality to improve future policy discussions,
- interest in understanding the importance of heterogeneity among the economic agents, leading among other examples to the construction of heterogeneous agent new Keynesian models (HANK models), which may potentially also improve understanding of the impact of macroeconomics on the income distribution,
- understanding the implications of integrating the findings of the increasingly useful behavioral economics literature into macroeconomics and behavioral finance.

=== Growth models ===
Research in the economics of the determinants behind long-run economic growth has followed its own course. The Harrod-Domar model from the 1940s attempted to build a long-run growth model inspired by Keynesian demand-driven considerations. The Solow–Swan model worked out by Robert Solow and, independently, Trevor Swan in the 1950s achieved more long-lasting success, however, and is still today a common textbook model for explaining economic growth in the long-run. The model operates with a production function where national output is the product of two inputs: capital and labor. The Solow model assumes that labor and capital are used at constant rates without the fluctuations in unemployment and capital utilization commonly seen in business cycles. In this model, increases in output, i.e., economic growth, can only occur because of an increase in the capital stock, a larger population, or technological advancements that lead to higher productivity (total factor productivity). An increase in the savings rate leads to a temporary increase in output as the economy builds more capital. However, eventually the depreciation rate will limit capital expansion: savings will be used to replace depreciated capital, leaving none to pay for additional expansion. Solow's model suggests that economic growth, measured by output per capita, depends solely on technological advances that enhance productivity. The Solow model can be interpreted as a special case of the more general Ramsey growth model, where households' savings rates are not constant as in the Solow model, but derived from an explicit intertemporal utility function.

In the 1980s and 1990s, endogenous growth theory arose to challenge the neoclassical growth theory of Ramsey and Solow. This group of models explains economic growth through factors such as increasing returns to scale in capital and learning-by-doing that are endogenously determined, rather than the exogenous technological improvement used to explain growth in Solow's model. Another type of endogenous growth model endogenizes technological progress by explicitly modelling research and development activities of profit-maximizing firms.

==== Climate change in macroeconomics ====
Natural resources flow through the economy and end up as waste and pollution.

Since the 1970s, various environmental problems have been integrated into macroeconomic models, particularly growth models, to study the implications of resource scarcity and global climate change for aggregate economic outcomes. The earliest work tackling the former question of scarcity was presented in William Jevons's 1865 book, The Coal Question, in which he postulates a paradox whereby productivity improvements may accelerate scarcity in a growing economy.

During the oil crises of the 1970s, when scarcity problems of natural resources were high on the public agenda, economists like Joseph Stiglitz and Robert Solow introduced non-renewable resources into neoclassical growth models to study the possibilities of maintaining growth in living standards under these conditions. In 2006, economist Nicholas Stern published the first comprehensive analysis of the global damages to the economy as a result of projected climate change scenarios in The Stern Review. This paper was the first to develop a model to assess the impact of slow, on-set climate change on GDP. More recently, the issue of climate change and the possibilities of a sustainable development are examined in so-called integrated assessment models (IAMs), pioneered by William Nordhaus. The use of IAMs is now widespread in climate economics, and is used to get both disaggregated, regional assessment of damages, or global damages, under different policy scenarios.

More theoretically, macroeconomic models in environmental economics model a system in which production takes natural resources such as land, water, or energy as inputs. In this case, one example of an integrated model would replace the circular flow of income diagram may be replaced by a more complex flow diagram reflecting the input of solar energy, which sustains natural inputs and environmental services which are then used as units of production, such as the early work of Herman Daly. Once consumed, natural inputs pass out of the economy as pollution and waste. The potential of an environment to provide services and materials is referred to as an "environment's source function", and this function is depleted as resources are consumed or pollution contaminates the resources. The "sink function" describes an environment's ability to absorb and render harmless waste and pollution; when waste output exceeds the sink's capacity, long-term damage occurs.

Many methods for national accounting that include environmental goods and services as components of economic output remain under discussion.

=== Heterodox macroeconomics ===
Other branches of macroeconomics that resist mainstream macroeconomic theories are broadly classified as heterodox macroeconomics. This discipline includes the aforementioned ecological economics, modern monetary theory, Marxian economics, and other schools of thought that build on theoretical traditions beyond neoclassical or Keynesian works. For example, heterodox economists see the driver of economic instability as price flexibility rather than price stickiness, and therefore develop models with different assumptions and structures.

For example, the Austrian school approaches macroeconomics from a distinct methodological standpoint, following Ludwig von Mises' Human Action; Austrians generally adopt "praxeology", holding that economic theory should be exclusively derived from basic axioms of human behaviour. On this basis, Austrian economists have objected to the core tools of mainstream economics, arguing that aggregate variables such as national output or general price levels mask the structural composition of an economy, obscuring the underlying heterogenous capital structure, subjective values, prices, and individual preferences that microeconomic decisions are based on. The best known substantive contribution of the school is the Austrian business cycle theory (ABCT) developed by Mises and elaborated by Hayek, a contemporary of Keynes.

== Macroeconomic policy ==
The division into various time frames of macroeconomic research leads to a parallel division of macroeconomic policies into short-run policies aimed at mitigating the harmful consequences of business cycles (known as stabilization policy) and medium- and long-run policies targeted at improving the structural levels of macroeconomic variables.

Stabilization policy is usually implemented through two sets of tools: fiscal and monetary policy. Both forms of policy are used to stabilize the economy, i.e. limiting the effects of the business cycle by conducting expansive policy when the economy is in a recession or contractive policy in the case of overheating.

Structural policies may include labour market policies that aim to change the structural unemployment rate, or policies that affect long-run propensities to save, invest, or engage in education, research, and development.

=== Monetary policy ===
Central banks conduct monetary policy mainly by adjusting short-term interest rates. The actual method through which the interest rate is changed differs from central bank to central bank, but typically the implementation happens either directly via administratively changing the central bank's own offered interest rates or indirectly via open market operations.

Via the monetary transmission mechanism, interest rate changes affect investment, consumption, asset prices like listed companies' shares prices and house prices, and through exchange rate reactions export and import. In this way, aggregate demand, employment, and ultimately inflation are affected. Expansionary monetary policy lowers interest rates, increasing economic activity, whereas contractionary monetary policy raises interest rates. In a fixed exchange rate system, interest rate decisions, together with direct intervention by central banks in exchange rate dynamics, are major tools for controlling the exchange rate.

In developed countries, most central banks follow inflation targeting, focusing on keeping medium-term inflation close to an explicit target, say 2%, or within an explicit range. This includes the Federal Reserve and the European Central Bank, which are generally considered to follow a strategy very close to inflation targeting, even though they do not officially label themselves as inflation targeters. In practice, an official inflation targeting often leaves room for the central bank to also help stabilize output and employment, a strategy known as "flexible inflation targeting". Most emerging economies focus their monetary policy on maintaining a fixed exchange rate regime, aligning their currency with one or more foreign currencies, typically the US dollar or the euro.

Conventional monetary policy can be ineffective in situations such as a liquidity trap. When nominal interest rates are near zero, central banks cannot loosen monetary policy through conventional means. In that situation, they may use unconventional monetary policy such as quantitative easing to help stabilize output. Quantity easing can be implemented by buying not only government bonds, but also other assets such as corporate bonds, stocks, and other securities. This allows lower interest rates for a broader class of assets beyond government bonds. A similar strategy is to lower long-term interest rates by buying long-term bonds and selling short-term bonds to create a flat yield curve, known in the US as Operation Twist.

=== Fiscal policy ===
Fiscal policy is the use of the government's revenue (taxes) and expenditure as instruments to influence the economy.

For example, if the economy is producing less than potential output, government spending can be used to employ idle resources and boost output, or taxes could be lowered to boost private consumption, which has a similar effect. Government spending or tax cuts do not have to make up for the entire output gap. There is a multiplier effect that affects the impact of government spending. For instance, when the government pays for a bridge, the project not only adds the bridge's value to output but also enables bridge workers to increase their consumption and investment, helping close the output gap.

The effects of fiscal policy can be limited by partial or full crowding out. When the government undertakes spending projects, it limits the resources available to the private sector. Full crowding out occurs in the extreme case when government spending replaces private-sector output rather than adding to the economy's output. A crowding-out effect may also occur if government spending raises interest rates, thereby limiting investment.

Some fiscal policy is implemented through automatic stabilizers without any active decisions by politicians. Automatic stabilizers do not suffer from the policy lags of discretionary fiscal policy. Automatic stabilizers use conventional fiscal mechanisms, but take effect as soon as the economy takes a downturn: spending on unemployment benefits automatically increases when unemployment rises, and tax revenue decreases, which shelters private income and consumption from part of the fall in market income.

=== Comparison of fiscal and monetary policy ===
There is a consensus that both monetary and fiscal instruments may affect demand and activity in the short run (i.e., over the business cycle). Economists usually favor monetary over fiscal policy to mitigate moderate fluctuations, however, because it has two major advantages. First, monetary policy is generally implemented by independent central banks instead of the political institutions that control fiscal policy. Independent central banks are less likely to be subject to political pressure to pursue overly expansionary policies. Second, monetary policy may suffer shorter inside lags and outside lags than fiscal policy. There are some exceptions, however: Firstly, in the case of a major shock, monetary stabilization policy may not be sufficient and should be supplemented by active fiscal stabilization. Secondly, in the case of a very low interest level, the economy may be in a liquidity trap in which monetary policy becomes ineffective, which makes fiscal policy the more potent tool to stabilize the economy. Thirdly, in regimes where monetary policy is tied to fulfilling other targets, in particular fixed exchange rate regimes, the central bank cannot simultaneously adjust its interest rates to mitigate domestic business cycle fluctuations, making fiscal policy the only usable tool for such countries.

== Macroeconomic models ==
Macroeconomic teaching, research, and informed debates normally evolve around formal (diagrammatic or equational) macroeconomic models to clarify assumptions and show their consequences precisely. Models include simple theoretical models, often containing only a few equations, used in teaching and research to highlight key basic principles, and larger applied quantitative models used by e.g. governments, central banks, think tanks and international organisations to predict effects of changes in economic policy or other exogenous factors or as a basis for making economic forecasting.

Well-known specific theoretical models include short-term models like the Keynesian cross, the IS–LM model and the Mundell–Fleming model, medium-term models like the AD–AS model, building upon a Phillips curve, and long-term growth models like the Solow–Swan model, the Ramsey–Cass–Koopmans model and Peter Diamond's overlapping generations model. Quantitative models include early large-scale macroeconometric model, the new classical real business cycle models, microfounded computable general equilibrium (CGE) models used for medium-term (structural) questions like international trade or tax reforms, Dynamic stochastic general equilibrium (DSGE) models used to analyze business cycles, not least in many central banks, or integrated assessment models like DICE.

=== Specific models ===
==== IS–LM model ====
In this example of a traditional IS–LM chart, the IS curve moves to the right, causing higher interest rates (i) and expansion in the "real" economy (real GDP, or Y).

The IS–LM model, invented by John Hicks in 1936, gives the underpinnings of aggregate demand (itself discussed below). It answers the question "At any given price level, what is the quantity of goods demanded?" The graphic model shows combinations of interest rates and output that ensure equilibrium in both the goods and money markets under the model's assumptions. The goods market is modeled as giving equality between investment and public and private saving (IS), and the money market is modeled as giving equilibrium between the money supply and liquidity preference (equivalent to money demand).

The IS curve consists of the points (combinations of income and interest rate) at which, for a given interest rate, investment equals public and private saving, given output. The IS curve is downward sloping because output and the interest rate have an inverse relationship in the goods market: as output increases, more income is saved, which means interest rates must be lower to spur enough investment to match saving.

The traditional LM curve is upward-sloping because the interest rate and output are positively related in the money market. As income (identical to output in a closed economy) increases, the demand for money rises, leading to a higher interest rate to offset the incipient rise in money demand.

The IS-LM model is often used in elementary textbooks to demonstrate the effects of monetary and fiscal policy, though it ignores many complexities of most modern macroeconomic models. A problem related to the LM curve is that modern central banks largely ignore the money supply in determining policy, contrary to the model's basic assumptions. In some modern textbooks, consequently, the traditional IS-LM model has been modified by replacing the traditional LM curve with an assumption that the central bank determines the interest rate of the economy directly.

==== AD-AS model ====
A traditional AD–AS diagram showing a shift in AD, and the AS curve becoming inelastic beyond potential output

The AD–AS model is a common textbook model for explaining the macroeconomy. The original version of the model shows the price level and level of real output given the equilibrium in aggregate demand and aggregate supply. The aggregate demand curve's downward slope means that more output is demanded at lower price levels. The downward slope can be explained as the result of three effects: the Pigou or real balance effect, which states that as real prices fall, real wealth increases, resulting in higher consumer demand of goods; the Keynes or interest rate effect, which states that as prices fall, the demand for money decreases, causing interest rates to decline and borrowing for investment and consumption to increase; and the net export effect, which states that as prices rise, domestic goods become comparatively more expensive to foreign consumers, leading to a decline in exports.

In many representations of the AD–AS model, the aggregate supply curve is horizontal at low levels of output; it becomes inelastic near the point of potential output, which corresponds with full employment. Since the economy cannot produce beyond the potential output, any AD expansion will lead to higher price levels instead of higher output.

In modern textbooks, the AD–AS model is often presented slightly differently, however, in a diagram showing not the price level, but the inflation rate along the vertical axis, making it easier to relate the diagram to real-world policy discussions. In this framework, the AD curve is downward sloping because higher inflation will cause the central bank, which is assumed to follow an inflation target, to raise the interest rate, which will dampen economic activity, hence reducing output. The AS curve is upward-sloping, consistent with a standard modern Phillips curve view, in which higher economic activity lowers unemployment, leading to higher wage growth and, in turn, higher inflation.

== See also ==
- Microeconomics
- Business cycle accounting
- Economic development
- Growth accounting
