= Christina Romer =

American economist (born 1958)

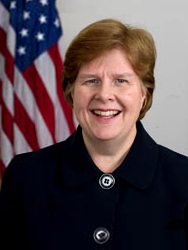

25th Chair of the Council of Economic Advisers
- In office January 29, 2009 – September 3, 2010
- President: Barack Obama
- Preceded by: Edward Lazear
- Succeeded by: Austan Goolsbee

Personal details
- Born: Christina Duckworth; December 25, 1958 (age 67) Alton, Illinois, U.S.
- Party: Democratic
- Spouse: David Romer
- Education: College of William & Mary (BA); Massachusetts Institute of Technology (MA, PhD)

Christina Duckworth Romer (née Duckworth; born December 25, 1958) is the Class of 1957 Garff B. Wilson Professor of Economics at the University of California, Berkeley and a former chair of the Council of Economic Advisers in the Obama administration. She resigned from her role on the Council of Economic Advisers on September 3, 2010.

After her nomination and before the Obama administration took office, Romer worked with economist Jared Bernstein to co-author the administration's plan for recovery from the 2008 recession. In a January 2009 video presentation, she discussed details of the job creation program that the Obama administration submitted to Congress.

== Early life and education ==
Romer was born in Alton, Illinois. She graduated from GlenOak High School in Canton, Ohio in June 1977. She obtained her bachelor's degree in economics from The College of William & Mary in 1981, and her Ph.D. from the Massachusetts Institute of Technology in 1985. Her doctoral advisors were Rudi Dornbusch and Peter Temin. Upon completion of her doctorate, she started working as an assistant professor at Princeton University. In 1988 she moved to the University of California, Berkeley and was promoted to full professor in 1993.

== Career ==
Romer's early work focused on a comparison of macroeconomic volatility before and after World War II. Romer showed that much of what had appeared to be a decrease in volatility was due to better economic data collection, although recessions have become less frequent over time.

She has also researched the causes of the Great Depression in the United States and how the US recovered from the depression. Her work showed that the Great Depression occurred more severely in the US than in Europe, and had somewhat different causes than the Great Depression in Europe. Romer showed that New Deal fiscal policy measures, though innovative, were very insufficient, and dwarfed by Hoover's tax increase two years earlier. However, accidental monetary policy played a large role in the US recovery from depression. This monetary policy came first from the devaluation of the dollar in terms of gold in 1933–1934, and later from the flight of European capital to the relatively stable US as war in Europe became more likely.

She has done work on fiscal and monetary policy from the Great Depression to the present, using notes from the meetings of the Federal Open Market Committee (FOMC) and the materials prepared by Fed staff to study how the Federal Reserve makes its decisions. Her work suggests that some of the credit for the relatively stable economic growth in the 1950s should lie with good policy made by the Federal Reserve, and that the members of the FOMC could at times have made better decisions by relying more closely on forecasts made by the Fed professional staff.

Her recent work (with David Romer) has focused on the impact of tax policy on government and general economic growth. This work looks at the historical record of US tax changes from 1945 to 2007, excluding "endogenous" tax changes made to fight recessions or offset the cost of new government spending. It finds that such "exogenous" tax increases, made for example to reduce inherited budget deficits, reduce economic growth (though by smaller amounts after 1980 than before). Romer and Romer also find "no support for the hypothesis that tax cuts restrain government spending; indeed ... tax cuts may increase spending. The results also indicate that the main effect of tax cuts on the government budget is to induce subsequent legislated tax increases." However, she notes that "Our baseline specification suggests that an exogenous tax increase of one percent of GDP lowers real GDP by roughly three percent."

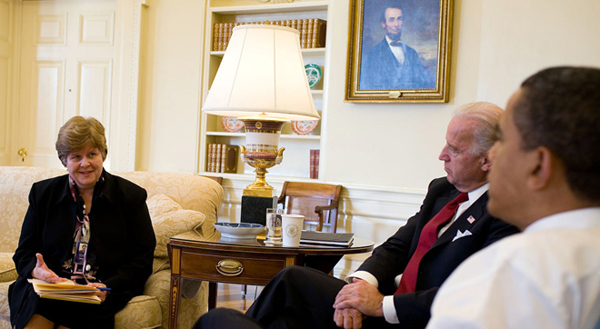
Romer meeting with then President Barack Obama and Vice President Joe Biden in the Oval Office, January 2009

She is a former vice president of the American Economic Association, a John Simon Guggenheim Memorial Foundation Fellowship recipient, a fellow of the American Academy of Arts and Sciences, a winner of the Berkeley Distinguished Teaching Award, and a winner of the Council for Economic Education's Visionary Award. Professor Romer is co-director of the Program in Monetary Economics at the National Bureau of Economic Research, and was a member of the NBER Business Cycle Dating Committee until she resigned from this position on November 25, 2008. She rejoined the NBER Business Cycle Dating Committee in 2010, and still serves in this position, alongside her husband.

In 2008, Romer was set to join the Harvard University faculty of economics, while her husband was offered a position at the university's Harvard Kennedy School. However, the Romers remained at Berkeley after Drew Gilpin Faust, Harvard's president, vetoed her appointment. Her decision resulted in substantial discussion within the discipline and in the mass media. The motivations for Faust's decision to block Romer's appointment remain unclear, though speculation has focused on an opposition among "New Classical" economists to her "New Keynesian" tendencies, or a reluctance to appoint MIT-trained faculty at Harvard.

Romer is a professor at the University of California, Berkeley"s Department of Economics. In 2021, she was named a Fellow of the Econometric Society, and Omicron Delta Epsilon, the international honor society for economics, awarded her the biennial John R. Commons Award.

=== Chair of the Council of Economic Advisers ===
Romer was approached by the Obama transition team in November 2008 about the position of CEA chair because of her deep knowledge of the Great Depression. In late 2008, along with fellow economic advisors Larry Summers and Peter R. Orszag, she presented then-President-elect Barack Obama with recommendations for a stimulus package. Romer calculated that a $1.8-trillion package was necessary to fill the output gap, but Summers rejected the proposal and opted not to include it in the memo fearing that a trillion-dollar package would not pass through Congress. The Obama administration ultimately passed an $800-billion package.

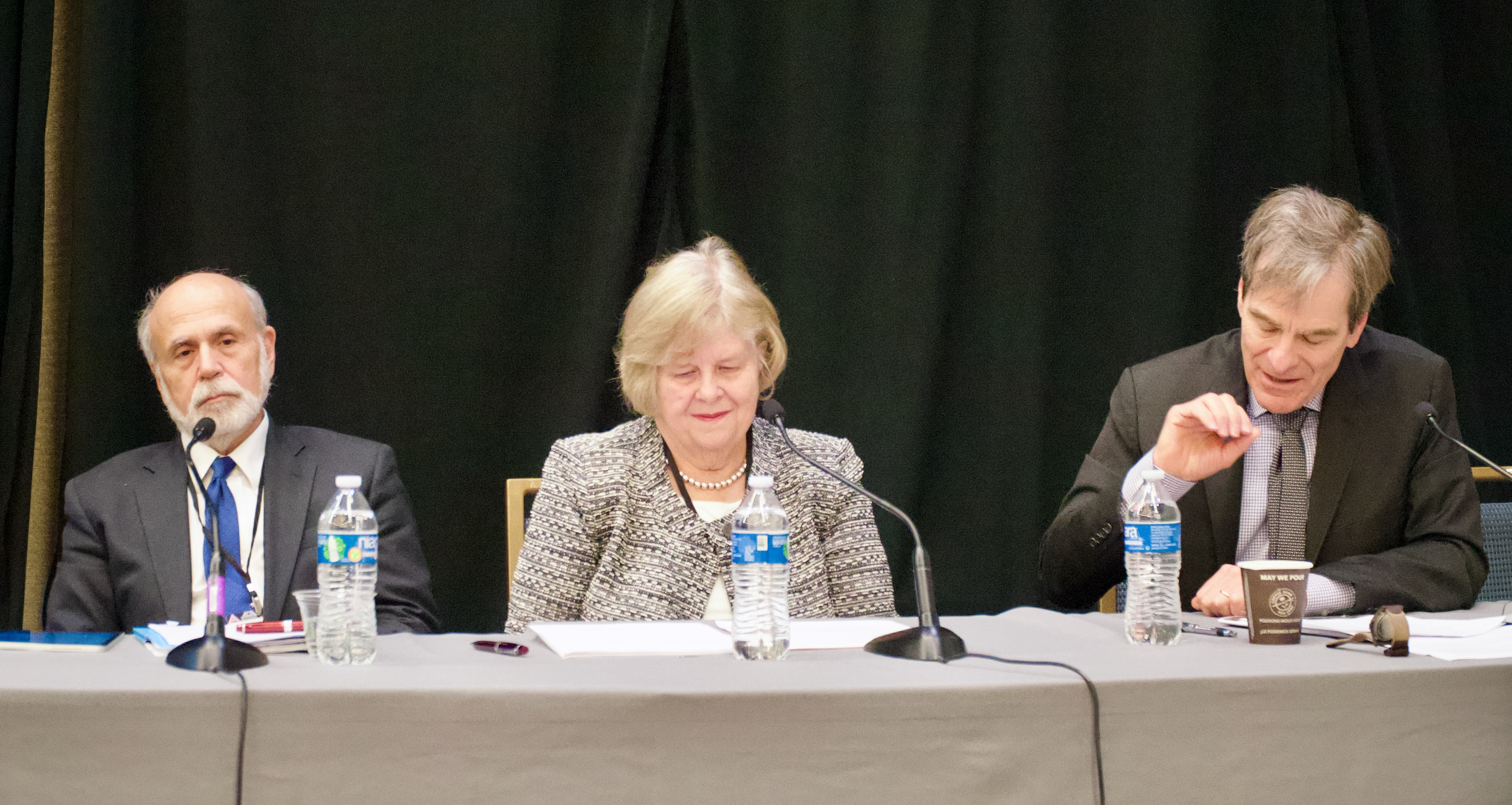
Ben Bernanke, Romer and John H. Cochrane at AEA 2025

She left the CEA to return to the University of California at Berkeley in September 2010, saying her departure from the Obama administration was timed so that her youngest child could begin high school in Berkeley.

In late October 2011, Romer published an editorial in The New York Times calling upon Federal Reserve Chair Ben Bernanke to begin targeting nominal GDP, citing arguments made by economists Greg Mankiw, Robert Hall, and Scott Sumner.

== Personal life ==
She is married to David Romer, her classmate at MIT and her colleague in the economics department at University of California, Berkeley. They have adjoining offices in the department, and collaborate on much of their research. The couple have three children together. She is not related to Paul Romer, the economist famous for his work on endogenous growth theory, although she has a son with the same name.

Political offices
Preceded by Edward Lazear	Chair of the Council of Economic Advisers; 2009–2010	Succeeded by Austan Goolsbee
Academic offices
Preceded by David Card	President of the American Economic Association; 2022–2023	Succeeded by Susan Athey
