= Greg Mankiw =

American economist (born 1958)

21st Chair of the Council of Economic Advisers
- In office May 29, 2003 – February 18, 2005
- President: George W. Bush
- Preceded by: Glenn Hubbard
- Succeeded by: Harvey Rosen

Personal details
- Born: Nicholas Gregory Mankiw; February 3, 1958 (age 68) Trenton, New Jersey, U.S.
- Party: Republican (before 2019); Independent (2019–present)
- Spouse: Deb Roloff
- Education: Princeton University (BA); Massachusetts Institute of Technology (MA, PhD); Harvard University (attended)

Academic background
- Doctoral advisor: Stanley Fischer

Academic work
- Discipline: Macroeconomics
- School or tradition: New Keynesian economics
- Doctoral students: Miles Kimball; Xavier Sala-i-Martin; Karen Dynan; Jason Furman; Ricardo Reis
- Website: Information at IDEAS / RePEc

Nicholas Gregory Mankiw (/ˈmænkjuː/ MAN-kyoo; born February 3, 1958) is an American macroeconomist who is currently the Robert M. Beren Professor of Economics at Harvard University.

Mankiw has written widely on economics and economic policy. As of February 2020, the RePEc overall ranking based on academic publications, citations, and related metrics put him as the 45th most influential economist in the world, out of nearly 50,000 registered authors. He was the 11th most cited economist and the 9th most productive research economist as measured by the h-index. In addition, Mankiw is the author of several best-selling textbooks, writes a popular blog, and from 2007 to 2021 wrote regularly for the Sunday business section of The New York Times. According to the Open Syllabus Project, Mankiw is the most frequently cited author on college syllabi for economics courses.

Mankiw is a conservative, and has been an economic adviser to several Republican politicians. From 2003 to 2005, Mankiw was Chairman of the Council of Economic Advisers under President George W. Bush. In 2006, he became an economic adviser to Mitt Romney, and worked with Romney during his presidential campaigns in 2008 and 2012. In October 2019, he announced that he was no longer a Republican because of his discontent with President Donald Trump and the Republican Party.

== Early life and education ==
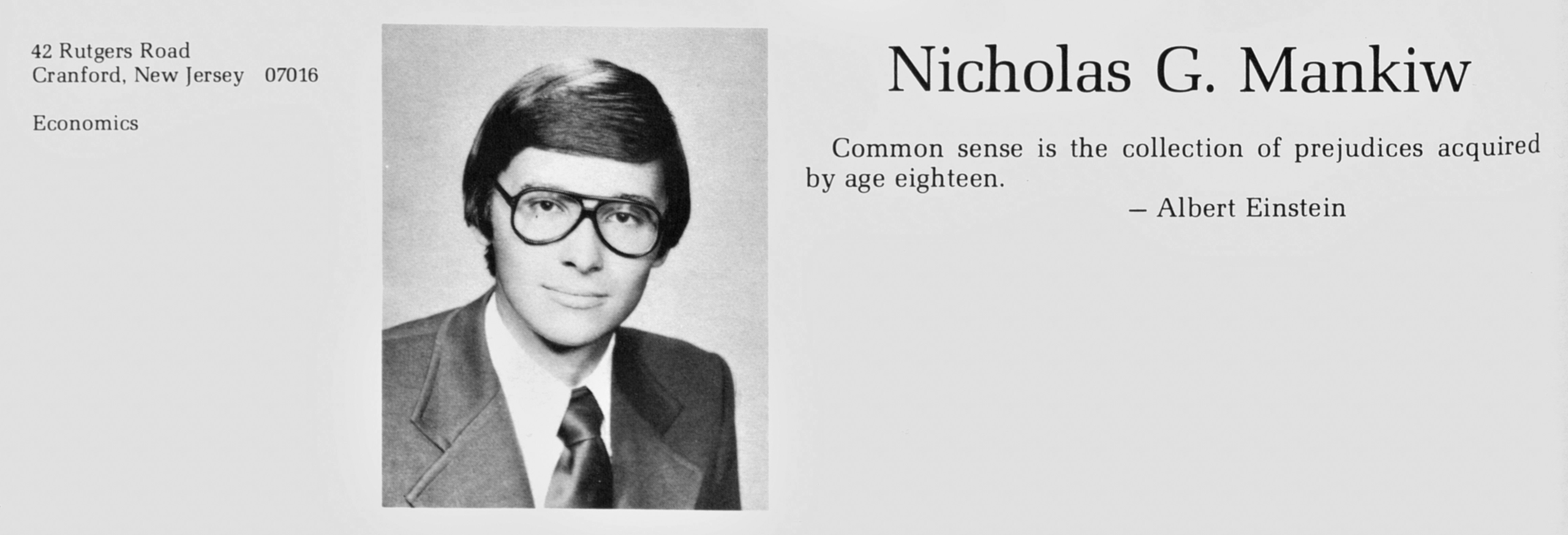
Mankiw in the Princeton University yearbook, 1980

Mankiw was born in Trenton, New Jersey. His grandparents were all Ukrainians. He grew up in Cranford, New Jersey, where he worked in Republican politics, and graduated from the Pingry School in 1976. In 1975, he studied astrophysics at the Summer Science Program. He graduated from Princeton University summa cum laude in 1980 with a Bachelor of Arts in economics. Mankiw completed a 72-page long thesis titled "Understanding Employment Fluctuation", which won the Wolf Balleisen Memorial Prize for the best senior thesis in economics. While at Princeton, Mankiw was classmates with the economist David Romer, who later became a coauthor, and was roommates with the playwright Richard Greenberg.

After college, Mankiw spent a year working on his doctoral degree at the Massachusetts Institute of Technology (MIT) and a subsequent year studying at Harvard Law School. He worked as a staff economist for the Council of Economic Advisers from 1982 to 1983, which he went on to chair two decades later. After leaving the council, he earned his PhD in economics from MIT in 1984 under the supervision of Stanley Fischer. He returned to Harvard Law School for a year, but having completed his PhD and realizing that he was better at economics, he left to briefly teach as an instructor at MIT, and then became an assistant professor of economics at Harvard University in 1985. He was promoted to full professor with tenure in 1987, at the age of 29.

== Academic writings ==
Mankiw did important work on menu costs, which are a source of price stickiness. His paper "Small Menu Costs and Large Business Cycles: A Macroeconomic Model of Monopoly", which was published in the Quarterly Journal of Economics in 1985, compared a firm's private incentive to adjust prices after a shock to nominal aggregate demand with that decision's social welfare implications. The paper concluded that expansion in aggregate demand may either increase welfare or reduce it, but the welfare reduction is never greater than the menu cost. A contraction in aggregate demand, however, reduces welfare, possibly in an amount much larger than the menu cost. In other words, from a social planner's point of view, prices may be stuck too high but never too low. The paper was a building block for work by Olivier Blanchard and Nobuhiro Kiyotaki on aggregate-demand externalities and for work by Laurence M. Ball and David Romer on the interaction between real and nominal rigidities.

In 2002, Mankiw and Ricardo Reis proposed an alternative to the widely used New Keynesian Phillips curve that is based on the slow diffusion of information among the population of price setters. Their sticky-information model displays three related properties that are more consistent with accepted views about the effects of monetary policy. Firstly, disinflations are always contractionary, though announced disinflations are less contractionary than surprise ones. Secondly, monetary policy shocks have their maximum impact on inflation with a substantial delay. Thirdly, the change in inflation is positively correlated with the level of economic activity.

A related 2003 article by Mankiw, Reis, and Justin Wolfers analyzed data on inflation expectations and documented substantial disagreement among both consumers and professional economists about expected future inflation. That disagreement is shown to vary over time and to move with inflation, the absolute value of the change in inflation, and relative price variability. The paper argues that a satisfactory model of economic dynamics must address those business-cycle moments. Noting that most macroeconomic models do not endogenously generate disagreement, they show that a sticky-information model broadly matches many of those facts. The model is also consistent with other observed departures of inflation expectations from full rationality, including autocorrelated forecast errors and insufficient sensitivity to recent macroeconomic news.

Mankiw has also written several papers on the empirical analysis of consumer behavior, often emphasizing the role of heterogeneity. An article with John Campbell in 1989 found that the aggregate consumption data are best described by a model in which about half of consumers obey the permanent income hypothesis, and half simply consume their current income, which is sometimes called hand-to-mouth behavior. An article with Stephen Zeldes in 1991 found the consumption of stockholders to covary more strongly with the stock market than the consumption of nonstockholders did. That provided a possible explanation for the equity premium puzzle.

Mankiw's most widely cited paper is "A Contribution to the Empirics of Economic Growth", which was coauthored with David Romer and David Weil and published in the Quarterly Journal of Economics in 1992. The paper argues that the Solow growth model, once augmented to include a role for human capital, explains reasonably well international differences in standards of living. According to Google Scholar, it has been cited more than 28,000 times, which makes it one of the most cited articles in the field of economics.

Beyond his work in macroeconomics, Mankiw has also written several other notable papers. In 1989, he coauthored a paper with David Weil that examined the demographic determinants of housing demand and predicted that the aging of baby boomers would undermine the housing market in the 1990s and 2000s. In 1986, he coauthored a paper with Michael Whinston in microeconomic theory that showed that under imperfect competition, entry tends to be excessive in homogeneous-goods industries because entrants fail to take into account the business-stealing externality that they impose on their rivals. When goods are heterogeneous, it is ambiguous whether free entry produces too many or too few firms because of offsetting business-stealing and product-variety externalities. (This paper coined the term "business-stealing effect," now widely used in the literature on monopolistic competition.)

== Textbooks ==
Mankiw has written two popular college-level textbooks: the intermediate-level Macroeconomics (now in its 12th edition, published by Worth Publishers) and the more famous introductory text Principles of Economics (now in its 11th edition, published by Cengage). Subsets of chapters from the latter book are sold under the titles Principles of Microeconomics, Principles of Macroeconomics, Brief Principles of Macroeconomics, and Essentials of Economics. The book was signed for a record advance. The New York Times reported in 1995 that Mankiw "was offered a $1.4 million advance by Harcourt Brace in Fort Worth to write a basic economics textbook. That's about three times as big as any other in the college textbook market and rivals those of all but a few celebrity authors."

Mankiw writes his textbook with a broad audience in mind, using a narrative approach. He often asks himself whether his own mother—who was not trained in economics but was interested in economic topics—would find it engaging: "Would Mom find it interesting? Would Mom understand this?"

When the first edition of the Principles book was published in 1997, The Economist magazine stated,

Mr. Mankiw has produced something long overdue: an accessible introduction to modern economics. By writing more in the style of a magazine than a stodgy textbook and explaining even complex ideas in an intuitive, concise way, he will leave few students bored or bewildered.... Most refreshing, though, is the book's even-handedness. Mr Mankiw seems to revel in setting out how different schools of thought have contributed to economists' current state of knowledge.

Since then, more than one million copies have been sold, and Mankiw has received an estimated $42 million in royalties from the book, which is priced at $280 per copy.

== Other career activities ==
In May 2003, President George W. Bush appointed Mankiw as Chairman of the Council of Economic Advisers. Mankiw served in that post from 2003 to 2005 and was followed by Harvey S. Rosen and then Ben Bernanke. As chairman, Mankiw was part of a George W. Bush administration effort seeking greater oversight of two government-sponsored enterprises: Fannie Mae and Freddie Mac. In a November 2003 speech to a conference of bank supervisors, he said:

The enormous size of the mortgage-backed securities market means that any problems at the GSEs matter for the financial system as a whole. This risk is a systemic issue also because the debt obligations of the housing GSEs are widely held by other financial institutions. The importance of GSE debt in the portfolios of other financial entities means that even a small mistake in GSE risk management could have ripple effects throughout the financial system.

The proposed regulatory reforms were passed into law only years later, during the 2008 financial crisis.

After leaving the CEA, Mankiw resumed teaching at Harvard and took over one of the most popular classes at Harvard College, the introductory economics course Ec 10, from Martin Feldstein. He has become an influential figure in the blogosphere and online journalism since launching his eponymous blog. The blog, which was originally designed to assist his Ec10 students, has gained a readership that extends far beyond students of introductory economics. Subtitled "Random Observations for Students of Economics," it was ranked the top economics blog by US economics professors in a 2011 survey.

In November 2006, Mankiw became an official economic adviser to Massachusetts Governor Mitt Romney's political action committee, Commonwealth PAC. In 2007, he signed on as an economic adviser to Romney's presidential campaign. He continued in that role during Romney's 2012 presidential bid.

In 2008, Mankiw published a piece titled "What if the Candidates Pandered to Economists?" He provided "an eight-plank platform designed to attract a majority of economists", including support for free trade, energy taxes and liberalization of drug laws.

From 2012 to 2015, Mankiw served as chairman of the Harvard economics department.

In February 2013, Mankiw publicly supported same-sex marriage in the United States in an amicus brief submitted to the US Supreme Court.

Mankiw was a trustee of the Urban Institute. In 2016, he became a member of the US Partnership on Mobility from Poverty, an effort funded by the Bill and Melinda Gates Foundation and run by the Urban Institute. The group of 24 scholars and activists is "a new collaborative aimed at discovering permanent ladders of mobility for the poor. The partnership will identify breakthrough solutions that can be put into action by philanthropy, practitioners, and the public and private sectors."

In 2026, Federal Reserve chair Kevin Warsh appointed Mankiw to lead a task force, along with Thomas Sargent and William White, on the central bank's inflation framework.

=== 2004 Economic Report of the President ===
Several controversies arose from CEA's February 2004 Economic Report of the President. In a press conference, Mankiw spoke of the gains from free trade and noted that the outsourcing of jobs by US companies is "probably a plus for the economy in the long run." This reflected mainstream economic analysis, but was criticized by many politicians, who drew a link between outsourcing and the slow recovery of the US labor market in early 2004.

Controversy also arose from a rhetorical question posed by the report and repeated by Mankiw in a speech about the report: "when a fast-food restaurant sells a hamburger, is it providing a service or combining inputs to manufacture a product?" He intended to point out that the distinction between manufacturing jobs and service industry jobs is somewhat arbitrary and so is a poor basis for policy. Even though the issue was not raised in the report, a news account led to criticism that the administration was seeking to cover up job losses in manufacturing by redefining jobs like cooking hamburgers as manufacturing.

=== 2011 student walkout ===
On November 2, 2011, a number of students in Mankiw's Economics 10 class walked out of his lecture. Several dozen of the 750 students participated. Before leaving, they handed Mankiw an open letter critical of his course that stated in part:

We found a course that espouses a specific—and limited—view of economics that we believe perpetuates problematic and inefficient systems of economic inequality in our society today. ... Economics 10 makes it difficult for subsequent economics courses to teach effectively as it offers only one heavily skewed perspective rather than a solid grounding on which other courses can expand. ... Harvard graduates play major roles in the financial institutions and in shaping public policy around the world. If Harvard fails to equip its students with a broad and critical understanding of economics, their actions are likely to harm the global financial system. The last five years of economic turmoil have been proof enough of this.

The students concluded their letter by stating that they would instead be attending the underway Occupy Boston demonstration. Counterprotesters showed up in that class, and Mankiw replied to his students in an article in The New York Times. An editorial in the student-run Harvard Crimson condemned the protest by stating:

The truth is that Ec 10, a requirement for economics concentrators, provides a necessary academic grounding for the study of economics as a social science. Professor Mankiw's curriculum sticks to the basics of economic theory without straying into partisan debate. We struggle to believe that we must defend his textbook, much maligned by the protesters, which is both peer reviewed and widely used. ... Supply-and-demand economics is a popular idea of how society is organized, and Mankiw's Ec 10 never presents itself as more than that.

=== Trump and Republican Party ===
In August 2016, Mankiw expressed opposition to the election of Donald Trump to the presidency. On his blog, he wrote:

Mr. Trump has not laid out a coherent economic worldview, but one recurrent theme is hostility to a free and open system of international trade. From my perspective as an economics policy wonk, that by itself is disqualifying. And then there are issues of temperament. ... he does not show the admirable disposition that I saw in previous presidents and presidential candidates I have had the honor to work for.

On October 28, 2019, Mankiw left the Republican Party and registered as an independent. He cited his disappointment in the party's overlooking of President Trump's misdeeds and a wish to vote in either primary in his home state, Massachusetts.

=== Advocacy of Pigouvian taxation ===
Throughout his career, Mankiw has advocated the implementation of Pigouvian taxes, such as a revenue-neutral carbon tax, to correct for externalities. Toward that end, he founded on his blog the informal Pigou Club. In 2016, he had a part in the Leonardo DiCaprio film Before the Flood, a documentary about global climate change, and was interviewed in the film on carbon taxation. In 2017, Mankiw was one of eight "Republican elder statesmen" to propose for conservatives embrace of a policy of carbon taxes, with all revenue rebated as lump-sum dividends. The group also included James A. Baker III, Martin S. Feldstein, Henry M. Paulson Jr., and George P. Shultz.

== Honors and awards ==
- 2007: Mankiw was elected a member of the American Academy of Arts and Sciences.
- 2009: Mankiw became president of the Eastern Economic Association; he succeeded Joseph Stiglitz and was followed by Paul Krugman.
- 2011: A survey of economics professors named Mankiw their second favorite living economist under the age of 60, just after Paul Krugman and just before Daron Acemoglu.
- 2012: The Princeton Review named Mankiw one of the 300 best professors in the nation.
- 2014: Along with David Card, Mankiw was elected vice president of the American Economic Association.
- 2017: The Council for Economic Education honored Mankiw with its Visionary Award.
- 2019: Omicron Delta Epsilon, the international honor society for economics, gave Mankiw the biennial John R. Commons Award.
- 2024: The Pingry School conferred on Mankiw the Letter-in-Life Award, described as "the highest honor bestowed on a graduate by Pingry."
- 2024: Mankiw was elected a fellow of the Econometric Society.
- 2026: The American Economic Association recognized Mankiw as a Distinguished Fellow.
- 2026: The British Academy elected Mankiw as an International Fellow.

== In popular culture ==
Mankiw is referenced in the 2011 film Elles, which shows an episode in the life of Anne (Juliette Binoche), a journalist writing an article about female student prostitution. When asked about her classes, one of the students, the Polish immigrant Alicja (Joanna Kulig), replies that she has been studying the neoliberal economist Greg Mankiw.

In addition, Mankiw is briefly mentioned in the novels Nineteen Minutes by Jodi Picoult and The Female Persuasion by Meg Wolitzer.

On February 18, 2019, Mankiw was mentioned in a clue on the television show Jeopardy! in the Double Jeopardy category Textbooks: "N. Gregory Mankiw has penned texts on these 'large' and 'small' fields, relating to how governments spend & how you do."

== Personal life ==
Mankiw lives in Massachusetts with his wife Deborah, to whom he has been married since 1984. They have three children, Catherine, Nicholas and Peter, and a dog, Tobin.

== Selected bibliography ==
- N. Gregory Mankiw (1985). "Small Menu Costs and Large Business Cycles: A Macroeconomic Model of Monopoly". Quarterly Journal of Economics. 100 (2): 529–537. doi:10.2307/1885395. JSTOR 1885395.
- N. Gregory Mankiw; David Romer; David Weil (1992). "A Contribution to the Empirics of Economic Growth". Quarterly Journal of Economics. 107 (2): 407–437. CiteSeerX 10.1.1.335.6159. doi:10.2307/2118477. JSTOR 2118477. S2CID 1369978.
- N. Gregory Mankiw (1998). Principles of Economics (1st ed.). Fort Worth, Texas: Dryden Press. ISBN 978-0030982385.
  - N. Gregory Mankiw (2006). Principles of Economics (4th ed.). South-Western College Pub. ISBN 978-0324224726.
  - N. Gregory Mankiw (2011). Principles of Economics (6th ed.). Cengage Learning. ISBN 978-0538453059.
- N. Gregory Mankiw (2010). Macroeconomics (7th ed.). Worth Publishers. ISBN 978-1429218870.

Political offices
Preceded by Glenn Hubbard	Chair of the Council of Economic Advisers; 2003–2005	Succeeded by Harvey Rosen
