= Timothy D. Adams =

American politician and businessman (born 1961)

Tim Adams
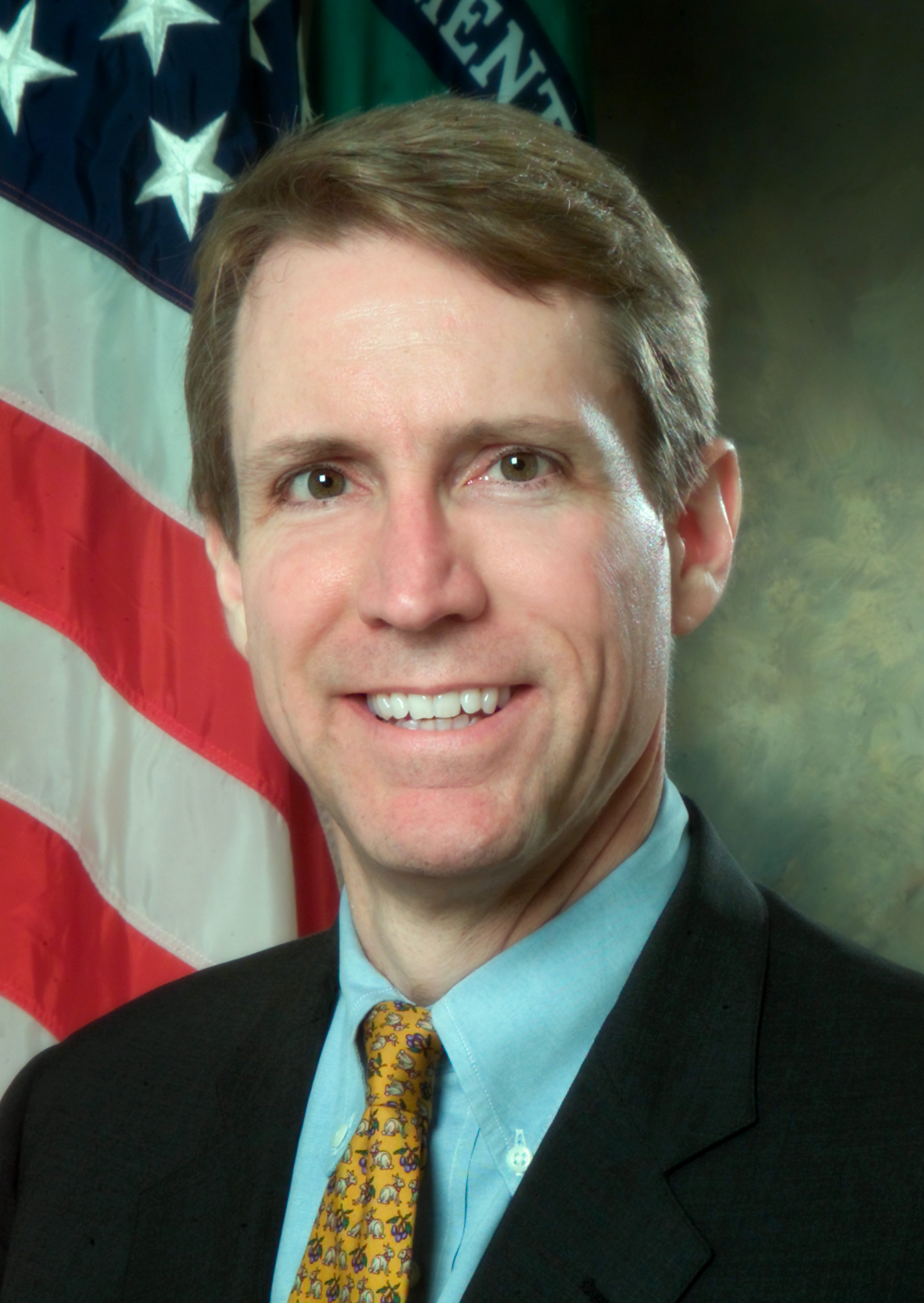

Under Secretary of the Treasury for International Affairs
- In office July 2, 2005 – August 2, 2007
- President: George W. Bush
- Preceded by: John B. Taylor
- Succeeded by: David McCormick

Personal details
- Born: Timothy Dees Adams; October 31, 1961 (age 63) Murray, Kentucky, U.S.
- Political party: Republican
- Education: University of Kentucky (BS, MA, MPA)

Timothy Dees Adams (born October 31, 1961, in Murray, Kentucky) is an American businessman, president and CEO of the Institute of International Finance and former Under Secretary for International Affairs at the United States Department of the Treasury.

== Education ==
Adams has a B.S. in finance, a masters in public administration, and an M.A. in international relations from the University of Kentucky.
