= John B. Taylor =

American economist (born 1946)

John Taylor
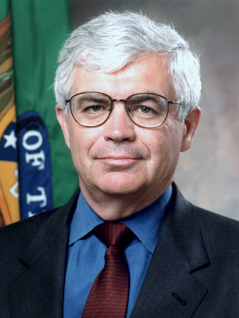

Under Secretary of the Treasury for International Affairs
- In office 2001–2005
- President: George W. Bush
- Preceded by: Timothy Geithner
- Succeeded by: Timothy D. Adams

Personal details
- Born: John Brian Taylor; December 8, 1946 (age 79) Yonkers, New York, U.S.
- Party: Republican
- Education: Princeton University (BA); Stanford University (MA, PhD)

Academic background
- Doctoral advisor: Theodore Wilbur Anderson
- Influences: Milton Friedman; Paul Volcker; E. Philip Howrey; Alan Greenspan

Academic work
- Discipline: Monetary economics
- School or tradition: New Keynesian economics
- Institutions: Stanford University; Hoover Institution; Columbia University
- Doctoral students: Lawrence J. Christiano
- Notable ideas: Taylor rule
- Website: Information at IDEAS / RePEc

John Brian Taylor (born December 8, 1946) is an American economist who is the Mary and Robert Raymond Professor of Economics at Stanford University, and the George P. Shultz Senior Fellow in Economics at Stanford University's Hoover Institution.

He taught at Columbia University from 1973 to 1980 and the Woodrow Wilson School and Economics Department of Princeton University from 1980 to 1984 before returning to Stanford. He has received several teaching prizes and teaches Stanford's introductory economics course as well as PhD courses in monetary economics.

In research published in 1979 and 1980 he developed a model of price and wage setting—called the staggered contract model—which served as an underpinning of a new class of empirical models with rational expectations and sticky prices—sometimes called new Keynesian models. In a 1993 paper he proposed the Taylor rule, intended as a recommendation about how nominal interest rates should be determined, which then became a rough summary of how central banks actually do set them. He has been active in public policy, serving as the Under Secretary of the Treasury for International Affairs during the first term of the George W. Bush administration. His book Global Financial Warriors chronicles this period. He was a member of the President's Council of Economic Advisors during the George H. W. Bush administration and Senior Economist at the Council of Economic Advisors during the Ford and Carter administrations.

In 2012 he was included in the 50 Most Influential list of Bloomberg Markets Magazine. Thomson Reuters lists Taylor among the "citation laureates" who are likely future winners of the Nobel Prize in Economics. He was president of the Mont Pelerin Society from 2018 to 2020.

== Early life and education ==
Born in Yonkers, New York, Taylor graduated from Shady Side Academy and earned his AB in economics from Princeton University in 1968 after completing a senior thesis titled "Fiscal and Monetary Stabilization Policies in a Model of Cyclical Growth". He then earned his PhD in economics from Stanford University in 1973.

== Academic contributions ==
Taylor's research—including the staggered contract model, the Taylor rule, and the construction of a policy tradeoff (Taylor) curve employing empirical rational expectations models—has had a major impact on economic theory and policy. Former Federal Reserve Chairman Ben Bernanke has said that Taylor's “influence on monetary theory and policy has been profound,” and Federal Reserve Chair Janet Yellen has noted that Taylor's work “has affected the way policymakers and economists analyze the economy and approach monetary policy."

Taylor contributed to the development of mathematical methods for solving macroeconomic models under the assumption of rational expectations, including in a 1975 Journal of Political Economy paper, in which he showed how gradual learning could be incorporated in models with rational expectations; a 1979 Econometrica paper in which he presented one of the first econometric models with overlapping price setting and rational expectations, which he later expanded into a large multicountry model in a 1993 book Macroeconomic Policy in a World Economy, and a 1983 Econometrica paper, in which he developed with Ray Fair the first algorithm to solve large-scale dynamic stochastic general equilibrium models which became part of popular solution programs such as Dynare and EViews.

In 1977, Taylor and Edmund Phelps, simultaneously with Stanley Fischer, showed that monetary policy is useful for stabilizing the economy if prices or wages are sticky, even when all workers and firms have rational expectations. This demonstrated that some of the earlier insights of Keynesian economics remained true under rational expectations. This was important because Thomas Sargent and Neil Wallace had argued that rational expectations would make macroeconomic policy useless for stabilization; the results of Taylor, Phelps, and Fischer showed that Sargent and Wallace's crucial assumption was not rational expectations, but perfectly flexible prices. These research projects together could considerably deepen our understanding of the limits of the policy-ineffectiveness proposition.

Taylor then developed the staggered contract model of overlapping wage and price setting, which became one of the building blocks of the New Keynesian macroeconomics that rebuilt much of the traditional macromodel on rational expectations microfoundations.

Taylor's research on monetary policy rules traces back to his undergraduate studies at Princeton. He went on in the 1970s and 1980s to explore what types of monetary policy rules would most effectively reduce the social costs of inflation and business cycle fluctuations: should central banks try to control the money supply, the price level, or the interest rate; and should these instruments react to changes in output, unemployment, asset prices, or inflation rates? He showed that there was a tradeoff—later called the Taylor curve—between the volatility of inflation and that of output. Taylor's 1993 paper in the Carnegie-Rochester Conference Series on Public Policy proposed that a simple and effective central bank policy would manipulate short-term interest rates, raising rates to cool the economy whenever inflation or output growth becomes excessive, and lowering rates when either one falls too low. Taylor's interest rate equation has come to be known as the Taylor rule, and it is now widely accepted as an effective formula for monetary decision making.

A key stipulation of the Taylor rule, sometimes called the Taylor principle, is that the nominal interest rate should increase by more than one percentage point for each one-percent rise in inflation. Some empirical estimates indicate that many central banks today act approximately as the Taylor rule prescribes, but violated the Taylor principle during the inflationary spiral of the 1970s.

Taylor has published research on the 2008 financial crisis and the Great Recession. He finds that the crisis was primarily caused by flawed macroeconomic policies from the U.S. government and other governments. Particularly, he focuses on the Federal Reserve which, under Alan Greenspan, a personal friend of Taylor, created "monetary excesses" in which interest rates were kept too low for too long, which then directly led to the housing boom in his opinion. He also believes that Freddie Mac and Fannie Mae spurred on the boom and that the crisis was misdiagnosed as a liquidity rather than a credit risk problem. He wrote that, "government actions and interventions, not any inherent failure or instability of the private economy, caused, prolonged, and worsen the crisis."

Taylor's research has also examined the impact of fiscal policy in the recent recession. In November 2008, writing for The Wall Street Journal opinion section, he recommended four measures to fight the economic downturn: (a) permanently keeping all income tax rates the same, (b) permanently creating a worker's tax credit equal to 6.2 percent of wages up to $8,000, (c) incorporating "automatic stabilizers" as part of overall fiscal plans, and (d) enacting a short-term stimulus plan that also meets long-term objectives against waste and inefficiency. He stated that merely temporary tax cuts would not serve as a good policy tool. His research with John Cogan, Tobias Cwik, and Volcker Wieland showed that the multiplier is much smaller in new Keynesian than in old Keynesian models, a result that was confirmed by researchers at central banks. He evaluated the 2008 and 2009 stimulus packages and argued that they were not effective in stimulating the economy.

In a June 2011 interview on Bloomberg Television, Taylor stressed the importance of long term fiscal reform that sets the U.S. federal budget on a path towards being balanced. He cautioned that the Fed should move away from quantitative easing measures and keep to a more static, stable monetary policy. He also criticized fellow economist Paul Krugman's advocacy of additional stimulus programs from Congress, which Taylor said will not help in the long run. In his 2012 book First Principles: Five Keys to Restoring America’s Prosperity, he endeavors to explain why these reforms are part of a broader set of principles of economic freedom.

== Selected publications ==
- Taylor, John B. (October 1975). "Monetary policy during a transition to rational expectations". Journal of Political Economy. 83 (5): 1009–22. CiteSeerX 10.1.1.740.3676. doi:10.1086/260374. JSTOR 1830083. S2CID 8603588.
- Taylor, John B.; Phelps, Edmund S. (February 1977). "Stabilizing powers of monetary policy under rational expectations". Journal of Political Economy. 85 (1): 163–90. CiteSeerX 10.1.1.741.1432. doi:10.1086/260550. JSTOR 1828334. S2CID 14729818.
- Taylor, John B. (May 1979). "Staggered wage setting in a macro model". The American Economic Review. 69 (2). American Economic Association: 108–113. JSTOR 1801626.

Reprinted in Taylor, John B. (1991), "Staggered wage setting in a macro model", in Mankiw, N. Gregory; Romer, David (eds.), New Keynesian economics, volume 1, Cambridge, Massachusetts: MIT Press, pp. 233–42, ISBN 9780262631334.

- Taylor, John B. (September 1979). "Estimation and control of a macroeconomic model with rational expectations". Econometrica. 47 (5): 1267–86. CiteSeerX 10.1.1.741.8996. doi:10.2307/1911962. JSTOR 1911962.
- Taylor, John B. (1986), 'New econometric approaches to stabilization policy in stochastic models of macroeconomic fluctuations'. Ch. 34 of Handbook of Econometrics, vol. 3, Z. Griliches and M.D. Intriligator, eds. Elsevier Science Publishers.
- Taylor, John B. (December 1993). "Discretion versus policy rules in practice". Carnegie-Rochester Conference Series on Public Policy. 39: 195–214. doi:10.1016/0167-2231(93)90009-L. Pdf.
- Taylor, John B. (1999), "An historical analysis of monetary policy rules", in Taylor, John B. (ed.), Monetary policy rules, Chicago: University of Chicago Press, ISBN 9780226791265.
- Taylor, John B. (2007). Global financial warriors: the untold story of international finance in the post-9/11 world. New York: W.W. Norton. ISBN 9780393064483.
- Taylor, John B. (2008), "Housing and monetary policy", in Reserve Bank of Kansas City (ed.), Housing, housing finance, and monetary policy: a symposium sponsored by the Federal Reserve Bank of Kansas City, Jackson Hole, Wyoming, August 30-September 1, 2007, Kansas City, Missouri: Reserve Bank of Kansas City, pp. 463–76, OCLC 170267547
- Taylor, John B. (2009), "The financial crisis and the policy response: an empirical analysis of what went wrong", in Bank of Canada Staff (ed.), Festschrift in honour of David Dodge's contributions to Canadian public policy: proceedings of a conference held by the Bank of Canada, November, 2008, Ottawa: Bank of Canada, pp. 1–18, ISBN 9780660199276.
- Taylor, John B. (2009). Getting off track: how government actions and interventions caused, prolonged, and worsened the financial crisis. Stanford, California: Hoover Institution Press. ISBN 9780817949716.
- Taylor, John B.; Shultz, George P.; Scott, Kenneth, eds. (2009). Ending government bailouts as we know them. Stanford, California: Hoover Institution Press. ISBN 9780817911287.
- Taylor, John B.; Ryan, Paul D. (30 November 2010). "Refocus the Fed on price stability instead of bailing out fiscal policy". Investor's Business Daily. Archived from the original on 13 April 2011.
- Taylor, John B. (2012). First principles: five keys to restoring America's prosperity. New York: W.W. Norton. ISBN 9780393345452.

== See also ==
- Members of the Hoover Institution
- Members of Stanford University's Economics Department

Political offices
Preceded by Timothy Geithner	Under Secretary of the Treasury for International Affairs; 2001–2005	Succeeded by Timothy D. Adams
