= Institute of International Finance =

International organization

Coordinates: 38.9002°N 77.0311°W

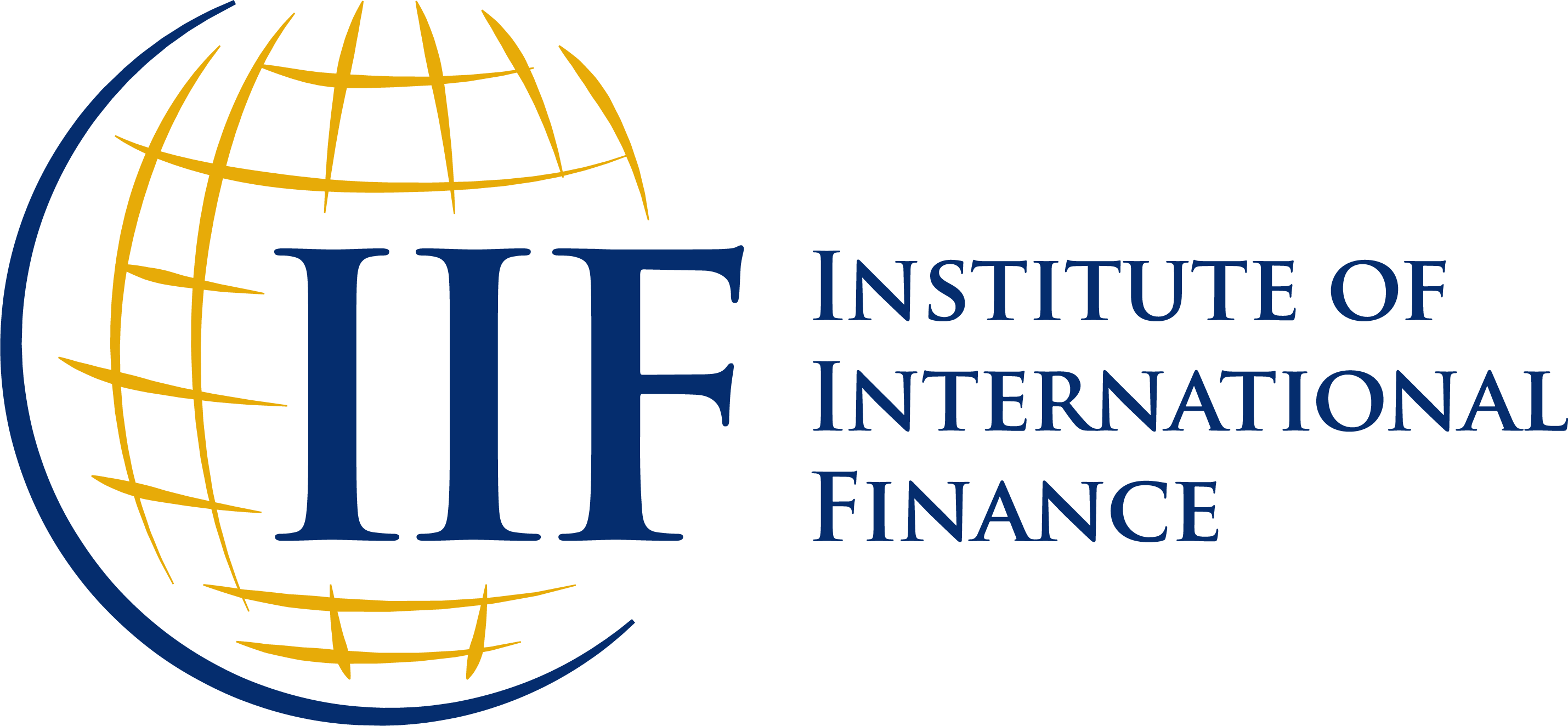
- Abbreviation: IIF
- Formation: 1983
- Headquarters: Washington, D.C.
- President and CEO: Timothy Adams
- Website: www.iif.com

The Institute of International Finance (IIF) is the association or trade group for the global financial services industry. It was created by 38 banks of leading industrialized countries in 1983 in response to the international debt crisis of the early 1980s, and has since expanded to represent more than 400 firms from more than 60 countries. IIF members include commercial and investment banks, asset managers, insurance companies, professional services firms, exchanges, sovereign wealth funds, hedge funds, central banks and development banks.

The IIF's mission is to support the financial industry in the prudent management of risks; to develop sound industry practices; and to advocate for regulatory, financial and economic policies that are in the broad interests of its members and foster global financial stability and sustainable economic growth.

The IIF focuses its advocacy, research and convening power on key topics of importance to its members, including sustainable finance, digital finance, risk and regulation, and debt. IIF provides its members with events, webinars, roundtables, workshops, podcasts, research reports and more.

The Institute's Board of Directors includes 48 leading CEOs and Chairs, led by Chair Ana Botín; Vice Chair and Treasurer Sim Tshabalala, Vice Chair (Banking) Piyush Gupta and Vice Chair (Insurance) Michel Liès. The IIF's President and Chief Executive Officer is Timothy D. Adams, who has held the position since February 1, 2013. The Institute is headquartered in Washington, D.C., and has satellite offices in Beijing, Singapore, Dubai and Brussels.

== Membership ==
IIF members include commercial and investment banks, asset managers, insurance companies, sovereign wealth funds, hedge funds, central banks and development banks.

== Former chairs ==
- William S. Ogden (Chairman of the formation committee and Interim Board, 1983)
- Richard D. Hill (1984–1986)
- Barry F. Sullivan (1986–1991)
- Antoine Jeancourt-Galignani (1991–1994)
- William R. Rhodes, Acting Chairman (April - October 1994)
- Toyoo Gyohten (1994–1997)
- Georges Blum (1997–1998)
- Sir John R.H. Bond (1998–2003)
- Josef Ackermann (2003–2012)
- Douglas Flint (2012-2016)
- Axel A. Weber (2016-2022)
- Ana Botín (2023- )
