= New Keynesian economics =

School of macroeconomics

New Keynesian economics is a school of macroeconomics that strives to provide microeconomic foundations for Keynesian economics. It developed partly as a response to criticisms of Keynesian macroeconomics by adherents of new classical macroeconomics.

Two main assumptions define the New Keynesian approach to macroeconomics. Like the New Classical approach, New Keynesian macroeconomic analysis usually assumes that households and firms have rational expectations. However, the two schools differ in that New Keynesian analysis usually assumes a variety of market failures. In particular, New Keynesians assume that there is imperfect competition in price and wage setting to help explain why prices and wages can become "sticky", which means they do not adjust instantaneously to changes in economic conditions.

Wage and price stickiness, and the other present descriptions of market failures in New Keynesian models, imply that the economy may fail to attain full employment. Therefore, New Keynesians argue that macroeconomic stabilization by the government (using fiscal policy) and the central bank (using monetary policy) can lead to a more efficient macroeconomic outcome than a laissez faire policy would.

New Keynesianism became part of the new neoclassical synthesis that incorporated parts of both it and new classical macroeconomics, and forms the theoretical basis of mainstream macroeconomics today.

== Development of New Keynesian economics ==
=== 1970s ===
The first wave of New Keynesian economics developed in the late 1970s. The first model of Sticky information was developed by Stanley Fischer in his 1977 article, Long-Term Contracts, Rational Expectations, and the Optimal Money Supply Rule. He adopted a "staggered" or "overlapping" contract model. Suppose that there are two unions in the economy, who take turns to choose wages. When it is a union's turn, it chooses the wages it will set for the next two periods. This contrasts with John B. Taylor's model where the nominal wage is constant over the contract life, as was subsequently developed in his two articles: one in 1979, "Staggered wage setting in a macro model", and one in 1980, "Aggregate Dynamics and Staggered Contracts". Both Taylor and Fischer contracts share the feature that only the unions setting the wage in the current period are using the latest information: wages in half of the economy still reflect old information. The Taylor model had sticky nominal wages in addition to the sticky information: nominal wages had to be constant over the length of the contract (two periods). These early new Keynesian theories were based on the basic idea that, given fixed nominal wages, a monetary authority (central bank) can control the employment rate. Since wages are fixed at a nominal rate, the monetary authority can control the real wage (wage values adjusted for inflation) by changing the money supply and thus affect the employment rate.

=== 1980s ===
==== Menu costs and imperfect competition ====
In the 1980s the key concept of using menu costs in a framework of imperfect competition to explain price stickiness was developed. The concept of a lump-sum cost (menu cost) to changing the price was originally introduced by Sheshinski and Weiss (1977) in their paper looking at the effect of inflation on the frequency of price-changes. The idea of applying it as a general theory of nominal price rigidity was simultaneously put forward by several economists in 1985–86. George Akerlof and Janet Yellen put forward the idea that due to bounded rationality firms will not want to change their price unless the benefit is more than a small amount. This bounded rationality leads to inertia in nominal prices and wages which can lead to output fluctuating at constant nominal prices and wages. Gregory Mankiw took the menu-cost idea and focused on the welfare effects of changes in output resulting from sticky prices. Michael Parkin also put forward the idea. Although the approach initially focused mainly on the rigidity of nominal prices, it was extended to wages and prices by Olivier Blanchard and Nobuhiro Kiyotaki in their influential article "Monopolistic Competition and the Effects of Aggregate Demand". Huw Dixon and Claus Hansen showed that even if menu costs applied to a small sector of the economy, this would influence the rest of the economy and lead to prices in the rest of the economy becoming less responsive to changes in demand.

While some studies suggested that menu costs are too small to have much of an aggregate impact, Laurence M. Ball and David Romer showed in 1990 that real rigidities could interact with nominal rigidities to create significant disequilibrium. Real rigidities occur whenever a firm is slow to adjust its real prices in response to a changing economic environment. For example, a firm can face real rigidities if it has market power or if its costs for inputs and wages are locked-in by a contract. Ball and Romer argued that real rigidities in the labor market keep a firm's costs high, which makes firms hesitant to cut prices and lose revenue. The expense created by real rigidities combined with the menu cost of changing prices makes it less likely that firm will cut prices to a market clearing level.

Even if prices are perfectly flexible, imperfect competition can affect the influence of fiscal policy in terms of the multiplier. Huw Dixon and Gregory Mankiw developed independently simple general equilibrium models showing that the fiscal multiplier could be increasing with the degree of imperfect competition in the output market. The reason for this is that imperfect competition in the output market tends to reduce the real wage, leading to the household substituting away from consumption towards leisure. When government spending is increased, the corresponding increase in lump-sum taxation causes both leisure and consumption to decrease (assuming that they are both a normal good). The greater the degree of imperfect competition in the output market, the lower the real wage and hence the more the reduction falls on leisure (i.e. households work more) and less on consumption. Hence the fiscal multiplier is less than one, but increasing in the degree of imperfect competition in the output market.

==== Calvo staggered contracts model ====
In 1983 Guillermo Calvo wrote "Staggered Prices in a Utility-Maximizing Framework". The original article was written in a continuous time mathematical framework, but nowadays is mostly used in its discrete time version. The Calvo model has become the most common way to model nominal rigidity in new Keynesian models. There is a probability that the firm can reset its price in any one period h (the hazard rate), or equivalently the probability (1 − h) that the price will remain unchanged in that period (the survival rate). The probability h is sometimes called the "Calvo probability" in this context. In the Calvo model the crucial feature is that the price-setter does not know how long the nominal price will remain in place, in contrast to the Taylor model where the length of contract is known ex ante.

==== Coordination failure ====
In this model of coordination failure, a representative firm e_{i} makes its output decisions based on the average output of all firms (ē). When the representative firm produces as much as the average firm (e_{i} = ē), the economy is at an equilibrium represented by the 45-degree line. The decision curve intersects with the equilibrium line at three equilibrium points. The firms could coordinate and produce at the optimal level of point B, but, without coordination, firms might produce at a less efficient equilibrium.

Coordination failure was another important new Keynesian concept developed as another potential explanation for recessions and unemployment. In recessions a factory can go idle even though there are people willing to work in it, and people willing to buy its production if they had jobs. In such a scenario, economic downturns appear to be the result of coordination failure: The invisible hand fails to coordinate the usual, optimal, flow of production and consumption. Russell Cooper and Andrew John's 1988 paper "Coordinating Coordination Failures in Keynesian Models" expressed a general form of coordination as models with multiple equilibria where agents could coordinate to improve (or at least not harm) each of their respective situations. Cooper and John based their work on earlier models including Peter Diamond's 1982 coconut model, which demonstrated a case of coordination failure involving search and matching theory. In Diamond's model producers are more likely to produce if they see others producing. The increase in possible trading partners increases the likelihood of a given producer finding someone to trade with. As in other cases of coordination failure, Diamond's model has multiple equilibria, and the welfare of one agent is dependent on the decisions of others. Diamond's model is an example of a "thick-market externality" that causes markets to function better when more people and firms participate in them. Other potential sources of coordination failure include self-fulfilling prophecies. If a firm anticipates a fall in demand, they might cut back on hiring. A lack of job vacancies might worry workers who then cut back on their consumption. This fall in demand meets the firm's expectations, but it is entirely due to the firm's own actions.

==== Labor market failures: Efficiency wages ====
New Keynesians offered explanations for the failure of the labor market to clear. In a Walrasian market, unemployed workers bid down wages until the demand for workers meets the supply. If markets are Walrasian, the ranks of the unemployed would be limited to workers transitioning between jobs and workers who choose not to work because wages are too low to attract them. They developed several theories explaining why markets might leave willing workers unemployed. The most important of these theories was the efficiency wage theory used to explain long-term effects of previous unemployment, where short-term increases in unemployment become permanent and lead to higher levels of unemployment in the long-run.

In the Shapiro-Stiglitz model workers are paid at a level where they do not shirk, preventing wages from dropping to full employment levels. The curve for the no-shirking condition (labeled NSC) goes to infinity at full employment.

In efficiency wage models, workers are paid at levels that maximize productivity instead of clearing the market. For example, in developing countries, firms might pay more than a market rate to ensure their workers can afford enough nutrition to be productive. Firms might also pay higher wages to increase loyalty and morale, possibly leading to better productivity. Firms can also pay higher than market wages to forestall shirking. Shirking models were particularly influential.Carl Shapiro and Joseph Stiglitz's 1984 paper "Equilibrium Unemployment as a Worker Discipline Device" created a model where employees tend to avoid work unless firms can monitor worker effort and threaten slacking employees with unemployment. If the economy is at full employment, a fired shirker simply moves to a new job. Individual firms pay their workers a premium over the market rate to ensure their workers would rather work and keep their current job instead of shirking and risk having to move to a new job. Since each firm pays more than market clearing wages, the aggregated labor market fails to clear. This creates a pool of unemployed laborers and adds to the expense of getting fired. Workers not only risk a lower wage, they risk being stuck in the pool of unemployed. Keeping wages above market clearing levels creates a serious disincentive to shirk that makes workers more efficient even though it leaves some willing workers unemployed.

=== 1990s ===
==== New neoclassical synthesis ====
In the early 1990s, economists began to combine the elements of new Keynesian economics developed in the 1980s and earlier with Real Business Cycle Theory. RBC models were dynamic but assumed perfect competition; new Keynesian models were primarily static but based on imperfect competition. The new neoclassical synthesis essentially combined the dynamic aspects of RBC with imperfect competition and nominal rigidities of new Keynesian models. Tack Yun was one of the first to do this, in a model that used the Calvo pricing model. Goodfriend and King proposed a list of four elements that are central to the new synthesis: intertemporal optimization, rational expectations, imperfect competition, and costly price adjustment (menu costs). Goodfriend and King also find that the consensus models produce certain policy implications: whilst monetary policy can affect real output in the short-run, but there is no long-run trade-off: money is not neutral in the short-run but it is in the long-run. Inflation has negative welfare effects. It is important for central banks to maintain credibility through rules based policy like inflation targeting.

==== Taylor Rule ====
In 1993, John B Taylor formulated the idea of a Taylor rule, which is a reduced form approximation of the responsiveness of the nominal interest rate, as set by the central bank, to changes in inflation, output, or other economic conditions. In particular, the rule describes how, for each one-percent increase in inflation, the central bank tends to raise the nominal interest rate by more than one percentage point. This aspect of the rule is often called the Taylor principle. Although such rules provide concise, descriptive proxies for central bank policy, they are not, in practice, explicitly proscriptively considered by central banks when setting nominal rates.

Taylor's original version of the rule describes how the nominal interest rate responds to divergences of actual inflation rates from target inflation rates and of actual gross domestic product (GDP) from potential GDP:

$$i_t = \pi_t + r_t^* + a_\pi  ( \pi_t - \pi_t^* )  + b_y ( y_t - y_t^* ).$$

In this equation, $\,i_t\,$ is the target short-term nominal interest rate set by the central bank (e.g. the federal funds rate in the US, the Bank of England base rate in the UK), $\,\pi_t\,$ is the rate of inflation as measured by the GDP deflator, $\pi^*_t$ is the desired rate of inflation, $\,a_\pi$ is the response coefficient that the inflation gap between $\,\pi_t\,$ and $\,\pi^*_t\,$ is multiplied by, $r_t^*$ is the assumed equilibrium real interest rate, $\,y_t\,$ is the logarithm of real GDP, $y_t^*$ is the logarithm of potential output, and $\,b_y$ is the response coefficient that the GDP output gap between $\,y_t\,$ and $y_t^*$ is multiplied by, and all of it is as determined by a linear trend.

==== New Keynesian Phillips curve ====
The New Keynesian Phillips curve was originally derived by Roberts in 1995, and has since been used in most state-of-the-art New Keynesian DSGE models. The new Keynesian Phillips curve says that this period's inflation depends on current output and the expectations of next period's inflation. The curve is derived from the dynamic Calvo model of pricing and in mathematical terms is:

$$\pi_{t} = \beta E_{t}[\pi_{t+1}] + \kappa y_{t}$$

The current period t expectations of next period's inflation are incorporated as $\beta E_{t}[\pi_{t+1}]$, where $\beta$ is the discount factor. The constant $\kappa$ captures the response of inflation to output, and is largely determined by the probability of changing price in any period, which is $h$:

$$\kappa = \frac{h[1-(1-h)\beta]}{1-h}\gamma$$.

The less rigid nominal prices are (the higher is $h$), the greater the effect of output on current inflation.

==== Science of monetary policy ====
The ideas developed in the 1990s were put together to develop the new Keynesian dynamic stochastic general equilibrium used to analyze monetary policy. This culminated in the three-equation new Keynesian model found in the survey by Richard Clarida, Jordi Gali, and Mark Gertler in the Journal of Economic Literature. It combines the two equations of the new Keynesian Phillips curve and the Taylor rule with the dynamic IS curve derived from the optimal dynamic consumption equation (household's Euler equation).

$$y_{t}=E_{t} y_{t+1} - \frac{1}{\sigma}(i_{t} - E_{t}\pi_{t+1})+v_{t}$$

These three equations formed a relatively simple model which could be used for the theoretical analysis of policy issues. However, the model was oversimplified in some respects (for example, there is no capital or investment). Also, it does not perform well empirically.

=== 2000s ===
In the new millennium there have been several advances in new Keynesian economics.

==== Introduction of imperfectly competitive labor markets ====
Whilst the models of the 1990s focused on sticky prices in the output market, in 2000 Christopher Erceg, Dale Henderson and Andrew Levin adopted the Blanchard and Kiyotaki model of unionized labor markets by combining it with the Calvo pricing approach and introduced it into a new Keynesian DSGE model.

==== Development of complex DSGE models ====
To have models that worked well with the data and could be used for policy simulations, quite complicated new Keynesian models were developed with several features. Seminal papers were published by Frank Smets and Rafael Wouters and also Lawrence J. Christiano, Martin Eichenbaum and Charles Evans The common features of these models included:

- Habit persistence. The marginal utility of consumption depends on past consumption.
- Calvo pricing in both output and product markets, with indexation so that when wages and prices are not explicitly reset, they are updated for inflation.
- Capital adjustment costs and variable capital use.
- New shocks
  - Demand shocks, which affect the marginal utility of consumption
  - Markup shocks that influence the desired markup of price over marginal cost.
- Monetary policy is represented by a Taylor rule.
- Bayesian estimation methods.

==== Sticky information ====
The idea of sticky information found in Fischer's model was later developed by Gregory Mankiw and Ricardo Reis. This added a new feature to Fischer's model: there is a fixed probability that a worker can replan their wages or prices each period. Using quarterly data, they assumed a value of 25%: that is, each quarter 25% of randomly chosen firms/unions can plan a trajectory of current and future prices based on current information. Thus if we consider the current period: 25% of prices will be based on the latest information available; the rest on information that was available when they last were able to replan their price trajectory. Mankiw and Reis found that the model of sticky information provided a good way of explaining inflation persistence.

Sticky information models do not have nominal rigidity: firms or unions are free to choose different prices or wages for each period. It is the information that is sticky, not the prices. Thus when a firm gets lucky and can re-plan its current and future prices, it will choose a trajectory of what it believes will be the optimal prices now and in the future. In general, this will involve setting a different price every period covered by the plan. This is at odds with the empirical evidence on prices. There are now many studies of price rigidity in different countries: the United States, the Eurozone, the United Kingdom and others. These studies all show that whilst there are some sectors where prices change frequently, there are also other sectors where prices remain fixed over time. The lack of sticky prices in the sticky information model is inconsistent with the behavior of prices in most of the economy. This has led to attempts to formulate a "dual stickiness" model that combines sticky information with sticky prices.

=== 2010s ===
The 2010s saw the development of models incorporating household heterogeneity into the standard New Keynesian framework, commonly referred as 'HANK' models (Heterogeneous Agent New Keynesian). In addition to sticky prices, a typical HANK model features uninsurable idiosyncratic labor income risk which gives rise to a non-degenerate wealth distribution. The earliest models with these two features include Oh and Reis (2012), McKay and Reis (2016) and Guerrieri and Lorenzoni (2017).

The name "HANK model" was coined by Greg Kaplan, Benjamin Moll and Gianluca Violante in a 2018 paper that additionally models households as accumulating two types of assets, one liquid and the other illiquid. This translates into rich heterogeneity in portfolio composition across households. In particular, the model fits empirical evidence by featuring a large share of households holding little liquid wealth: the 'hand-to-mouth' households. Consistent with empirical evidence, about two-thirds of these households hold non-trivial amounts of illiquid wealth, despite holding little liquid wealth. These households are known as wealthy hand-to-mouth households, a term introduced in a 2014 study of fiscal stimulus policies by Kaplan and Violante.

The existence of wealthy hand-to-mouth households in New Keynesian models matters for the effects of monetary policy, because the consumption behavior of those households is strongly sensitive to changes in disposable income, rather than variations in the interest rate (i.e. the price of future consumption relative to current consumption). The direct corollary is that monetary policy is mostly transmitted via general equilibrium effects that work through the household labor income, rather than through intertemporal substitution, which is the main transmission channel in Representative Agent New Keynesian (RANK) models.

There are two main implications for monetary policy. First, monetary policy interacts strongly with fiscal policy, because of the failure of Ricardian Equivalence due to the presence of hand-to-mouth households. In particular, changes in the interest rate shift the Government's budget constraint, and the fiscal response to this shift affects households' disposable income. Second, aggregate monetary shocks are not distributional neutral since they affect the return on capital, which affects households with different levels of wealth and assets differently.

== Policy implications ==
New Keynesian economists agree with New Classical economists that in the long run, the classical dichotomy holds: changes in the money supply are neutral. However, because prices are sticky in the New Keynesian model, an increase in the money supply (or equivalently, a decrease in the interest rate) does increase output and lower unemployment in the short run. Furthermore, some New Keynesian models confirm the non-neutrality of money under several conditions.

Nonetheless, New Keynesian economists do not advocate using expansive monetary policy for short run gains in output and employment, as it would raise inflationary expectations and thus store up problems for the future. Instead, they advocate using monetary policy for stabilization. That is, suddenly increasing the money supply just to produce a temporary economic boom is not recommended as eliminating the increased inflationary expectations will be impossible without producing a recession.

However, when the economy is hit by some unexpected external shock, it may be a good idea to offset the macroeconomic effects of the shock with monetary policy. This is especially true if the unexpected shock is one (like a fall in consumer confidence) which tends to lower both output and inflation; in that case, expanding the money supply (lowering interest rates) helps by increasing output while stabilizing inflation and inflationary expectations.

Studies of optimal monetary policy in New Keynesian DSGE models have focused on interest rate rules (especially 'Taylor rules'), specifying how the central bank should adjust the nominal interest rate in response to changes in inflation and output. (More precisely, optimal rules usually react to changes in the output gap, rather than changes in output per se.) In some simple New Keynesian DSGE models, it turns out that stabilizing inflation suffices, because maintaining perfectly stable inflation also stabilizes output and employment to the maximum degree desirable. Blanchard and Galí have called this property the 'divine coincidence'.

However, they also show that in models with more than one market imperfection (for example, frictions in adjusting the employment level, as well as sticky prices), there is no longer a 'divine coincidence', and instead there is a tradeoff between stabilizing inflation and stabilizing employment. Further, while some macroeconomists believe that New Keynesian models are on the verge of being useful for quarter-to-quarter quantitative policy advice, disagreement exists.

Alves (2014) showed that the divine coincidence does not necessarily hold in the non-linear form of the standard New-Keynesian model. This property would only hold if the monetary authority is set to keep the inflation rate at exactly 0%. At any other desired target for the inflation rate, there is an endogenous trade-off, even under the absence real imperfections such as sticky wages, and the divine coincidence no longer holds.

== Relation to other macroeconomic schools ==
Over the years, a sequence of 'new' macroeconomic theories related to or opposed to Keynesianism have been influential. After World War II, Paul Samuelson used the term neoclassical synthesis to refer to the integration of Keynesian economics with neoclassical economics. The idea was that the government and the central bank would maintain rough full employment, so that neoclassical notions—centered on the axiom of the universality of scarcity—would apply. John Hicks' IS/LM model was central to the neoclassical synthesis.

Later work by economists such as James Tobin and Franco Modigliani involving more emphasis on the microfoundations of consumption and investment was sometimes called neo-Keynesianism. It is often contrasted with the post-Keynesianism of Paul Davidson, which emphasizes the role of fundamental uncertainty in economic life, especially concerning issues of private fixed investment.

New Keynesianism was a response to Robert Lucas and the new classical school. That school criticized the inconsistencies of Keynesianism in the light of the concept of "rational expectations". The new classicals combined a unique market-clearing equilibrium (at full employment) with rational expectations. The New Keynesians used "microfoundations" to demonstrate that price stickiness hinders markets from clearing. Thus, the rational expectations-based equilibrium need not be unique.

Whereas the neoclassical synthesis hoped that fiscal and monetary policy would maintain full employment, the new classicals assumed that price and wage adjustment would automatically attain this situation in the short run. The new Keynesians, on the other hand, saw full employment as being automatically achieved only in the long run, since prices are "sticky" in the short run. Government and central-bank policies are needed because the "long run" may be very long.

Ultimately, the differences between new classical macroeconomics and New Keynesian economics were resolved in the new neoclassical synthesis of the 1990s, which forms the basis of mainstream economics today, and the Keynesian stress on the importance of centralized coordination of macroeconomic policies (e.g., monetary and fiscal stimulus), international economic institutions such as the World Bank and International Monetary Fund (IMF), and of the maintenance of a controlled trading system was highlighted during the 2008 global financial and economic crisis. This has been reflected in the work of IMF economists and of Donald Markwell.

== Major New Keynesian economists ==
- Jordi Galí
- Mark Gertler
- Nobuhiro Kiyotaki
- Michael Woodford
- Gregory Mankiw

== See also ==
- Calvo (staggered) contracts
- 2008–2009 Keynesian resurgence
- New neoclassical synthesis
- Sticky prices
- Welfare cost of business cycles
- Taylor Contracts (economics)
