= Real rigidity =

Economic concept, a fixed price or wage

In macroeconomics, rigidities are real prices and wages that fail to adjust to the level indicated by equilibrium or if something holds one price or wage fixed to a relative value of another. Real rigidities can be distinguished from nominal rigidities, rigidities that do not adjust because prices can be sticky and fail to change value even as the underlying factors that determine prices fluctuate. Real rigidities, along with nominal, are a key part of new Keynesian economics. Economic models with real rigidities lead to nominal shocks (like changes in monetary policy) having a large impact on the economy.

== In the product market ==
Real price rigidity can result from several factors. First, firms with market power can raise their mark-ups to offset declines in marginal cost and maintain a high price. Search costs can contribute to real rigidities through "thick market externalities". A thick market has many buyers and sellers, so search costs are lower. Thick markets can be expected to occur more often during booms, and they thin during downturns. If this pattern causes marginal costs to increase during recessions, thick markets can lead to real rigidities. "Customer markets" can also create real rigidities. In customer markets, firms take advantage of their market power and refuse to lower prices because they do not want to give customers an incentive to shop elsewhere and search for prices that are even lower. They would rather offer the customer a consistent price and have the customer consistently shop at their store. Also, customers will likely not notice a price cut as much as a price increase, giving the store less of an incentive to cut prices.

The complexity of the "input-output table" can also lead to rigidity. Decentralized global supply chains lead to many firms competing for the same inputs and producing the same outputs, but an individual firm does not know whether the other firms and industries will be affected the same way in a shock. Cutting prices in a situation would not necessarily create more demand for a firm's products; it may just lead to lower profits and bankruptcy. Firms face large information requirements in determining how to optimize their pricing. They not only have to know the demand for their own goods and their own costs, they have to know the pricing factors for all their competitors and other firms in the vast market of inputs and outputs. Capital market imperfections lead to more real rigidities. Capital markets may have asymmetric information problems because borrowers are better aware of their situation than lenders. This can lead to firms seeking more external finance during downturns, which drives up the firm's cost and creates another rigidity. Imperfect information can also create rigidity in the consumer market. Consumers may see price as an indicator for quality. Firms may be reluctant to cut their prices if they fear that consumers might start to the product as "cheap".

== In the labor market ==
New Keynesian economists have sought to explain persistently high unemployment in industrialized economies. New Keynesians explain part of this excess supply in the labor market with real wage rigidities that hold wages above market clearing levels. Economists have three main groups of theories for explaining real rigidities in the labor market: implicit contract theories, efficiency wage theories, and insider–outsider theories. New Keynesian economics is especially associated with the latter two. Implicit contract theory attributes stable real wages to implied agreements between employers and workers. Firms serve not just as consumers of labor, but also as wage insurers. By showing their workers that they will provide stable real wages, firms secure their loyalty. Seeing implicit contracts as a poor basis for real wage rigidities, new Keynesian economists sought other explanations.

Efficiency wage theories explain why firms might pay their employees more than the market clearing rate. Since workers' productivity can be dependent on their wages, employers have an incentive to pay their workers to the point where they are most productive. Under these models, wages are not determined strictly by the supply and demand for labor but by the marginal productivity of workers. Economists have several explanations for the intuition behind efficiency wages. In "adverse selection" models, firms find it more cost effective to offer a high wage and attract skilled workers rather than carefully investigating a workers skills and firing workers who turn out not to be adequately skilled. In the "shirking model," a firm pays a worker above the market rate because they want to give the worker an incentive to perform well and not shirk at his current job. If the worker's next best job opportunity offers lower pay than his current position, he will have an incentive to perform well to keep his current job. In "turnover cost" models, firms pay their workers above market wages to prevent turnover and the costs of recruiting and training replacement employees. In "gift exchange" models firms pay high wages to increase productivity through improved worker morale. In fairness models, a more recent trend in the efficiency wage literature, employers have to pay a sociologically "fair" wage in order to encourage workers to be productive.
