= Ricardo Reis (economist) =

Portuguese economist (born 1978)

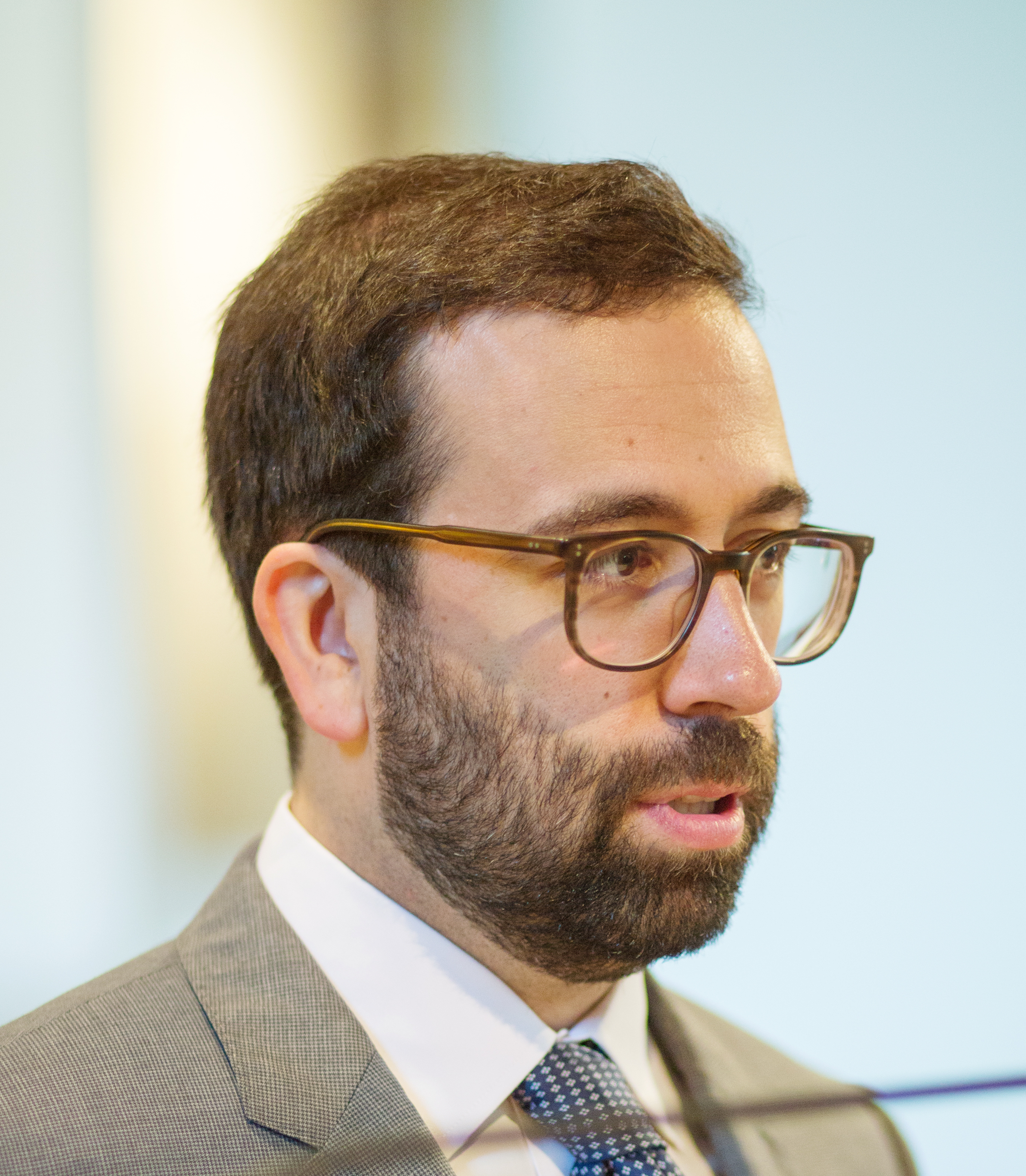
- Born: 1 September 1978 (age 48); Porto, Portugal

Academic background
- Education: London School of Economics (BSc); Harvard University (PhD)
- Influences: N. Gregory Mankiw

Academic work
- Discipline: Macroeconomics
- School or tradition: New Keynesian economics
- Institutions: London School of Economics
- Website: Information at IDEAS / RePEc

Ricardo A. M. R. Reis FBA (born 1 September 1978) is a Portuguese economist who is currently the A. W. Phillips Professor of Economics at the London School of Economics. He works in macroeconomics, finance, and international economics and won the 2021 Yrjö Jahnsson Foundation medal awarded every two years by the European Economic Association for best economist under the age of 45. He writes a weekly op-ed for the Portuguese newspaper Expresso.

== Academic career ==
Reis earned his Bachelor of Science (B.Sc.) degree from the London School of Economics in 1999, and his Doctor of Philosophy (Ph.D.) from Harvard University in 2004. He taught at Princeton University from 2004 to 2008 before moving to Columbia University as a full professor at the age of 29, one of the youngest ever in the history of the university. He is an academic advisor and visiting scholar at central banks around the world, and sits on the board of multiple institutions.

Reis was elected a Fellow of the British Academy in 2024, a Fellow of the Lisbon Academy of Sciences in 2023, and a Fellow of the Econometric Society in 2019.

== Economic contributions ==
Reis is known for contributing original ideas to economic science and policy debates:

- Sticky information and inattentiveness: With Gregory Mankiw, Reis proposed the sticky-information Phillips curve and followed it later with rational theories of inattention, and sticky-information models in general equilibrium.
- Disagreement in surveys of inflation expectations: With Gregory Mankiw and Justin Wolfers, Reis started the modern empirical literature that focuses on disagreement in survey inflation expectations to measure credibility, anchoring, and that guides theories of limited information and learning.
- Pure inflation: With Mark Watson, Reis developed measures of pure inflation, that estimate core inflation by statistically removing relative price changes.
- Diabolic or doom loop: In 2011, With Markus Brunnermeier, Luis Garicano, Philip R. Lane and others, Reis argued that banks holding bonds issued by their sovereign creates a diabolic loop: small changes in the perceived solvency of a sovereign cause large losses, make banks more likely to fail, and raise expected bailout costs confirming the bad state of public finances. This concept became central in accounts of the euro area crisis and is also referred to as the doom loop (economics) or the bank-government nexus.
- Sovereign bond backed securities (or ESBies): With the same colleagues, he proposed creating European Safe Bonds (ESBies) to break the diabolic loop without having the joint and several liability of Eurobonds. The European Systemic Risk Board in 2018 proposed a variant of ESBies, labelled Sovereign Bond-Backed Securities (or SBBS) for a more stable Eurozone.
- HANK models: In 2011, with Hyunseung Oh, Reis wrote the first model that merged the S. Rao Aiyagari model of incomplete markets with a New Keynesian model of nominal rigidities. With Alisdair McKay he wrote the first business-cycle model that merged the Krusell-Smith model of business cycles with the Christiano–Eichenbaum–Evans model of monetary policy. These models later evolved into HANK, or Heterogeneous Agent New Keynesian Models.
- Automatic stabilizers: With Alisdair McKay, Reis showed that automatic stabilizers can be effective by reducing the need for precautionary savings at the start of recessions that triggers Keynesian animal spirits.
- Central bank losses and solvency: In 2013, with Robert E. Hall, Reis predicted that a consequence of quantitative easing was that once central banks started hiking rates, they would suffer large losses. This prediction came true ten years later. Reis studied the fiscal footprint of monetary policies on budget constraints and the link between central bank losses, monetary independence, and hyperinflations.
- The misallocation hypothesis of the Euro area crisis: In 2013, Reis proposed the misallocation hypothesis for the stagnation in Southern Europe since the start of the euro. Joining the eurozone meant large capital inflows that were misallocated because of underdeveloped financial and political systems leading to a slump in productivity and sowing the seeds of the crisis. Financial integration without financial depth creates crashes.
- Abundant reserves and the Friedman rule: In 2016, at the Kansas City Federal Reserve economic policy symposium, Reis proposed that a central bank's balance sheet should be just large enough to satiate the demand for bank reserves and satisfy the Friedman rule. He also pointed to the limits of a larger balance sheet because of the fluctuations in net income that result. The Fed adopted this system in 2019.
- Central bank swap lines: In 2018, with Saleem Bahaj, Reis showed that central bank swap lines work just like a discount window for foreign banks, and so put a ceiling on the cross-currency basis, or covered interest parity deviations. He proposed that the swap lines should be open daily and extended to more countries during crisis. The Fed and the ECB did so during the pandemic in 2020.
- Debt revenue and m* versus r*: In 2021, Reis argued that the fall in the r* on government bonds came with an increase in the wedge between the return on private capital and government bonds. This creates a seignorage revenue from issuing public debt: the debt revenue. Reis argued in 2021 that r* will likely rise in the future as this wedge closes.
- The inflation of 2021-2023: In 2021, Reis warned that inflation would soon rise because the expectations data was drifting up, both in surveys and in option prices just like in the early 1970s. He later provided an early account of why inflation was out of control.
- A crash course on crises: With Markus Brunnermeier, Reis published in 2023 an introduction to the macroeconomic and financial concepts behind financial crises in the book A Crash Course on Crises.
- The rise of the RMB as an international currency: With Saleem Bahaj, Reis has argued that the foundations for the international use of the RMB are in place, suggesting that its use in international payments will rise in the 2020s.
