= Guillermo Calvo =

Argentine-American economist

Guillermo Antonio Calvo
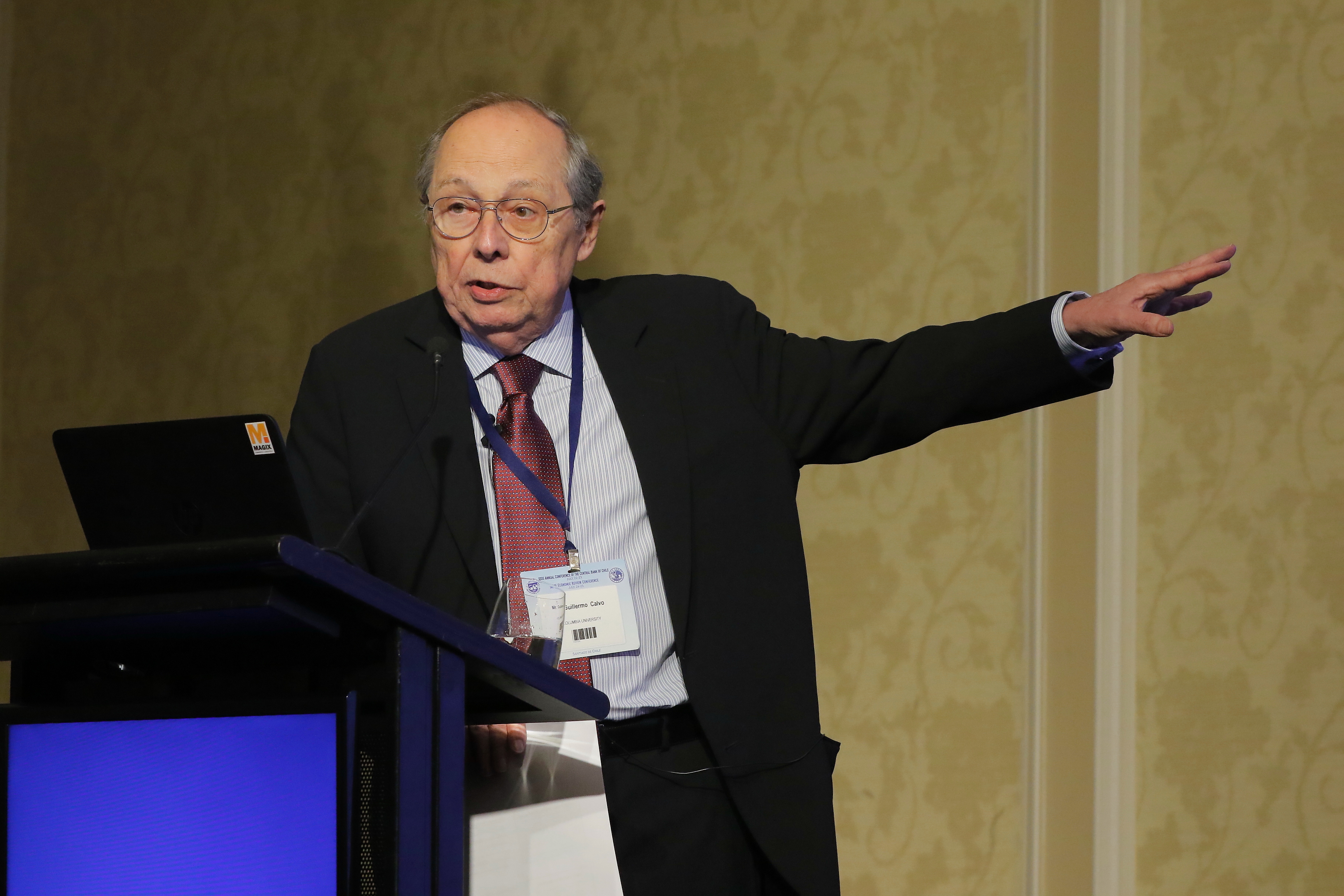
- Born: 1941 (age 84–85); Buenos Aires, Argentina

Academic background
- Education: Yale (Ph.D. 1974, M.A. 1965) University of Buenos Aires
- Doctoral advisor: Tjalling Koopmans
- Influences: Edmund Phelps, Julio Olivera

Academic work
- Discipline: Macroeconomics; Monetary economics
- School or tradition: New Keynesian economics
- Institutions: Columbia University
- Website: Information at IDEAS / RePEc

Guillermo Antonio Calvo (born 1941) is an Argentine-American economist who is director of Columbia University's mid-career Program in Economic Policy Management in their School of International and Public Affairs (SIPA).

He published significant research in macroeconomics, especially monetary economics and the economics of emerging markets and transition economies.

== Biography ==
Calvo is professor of economics, international and public affairs, and director of the Program in Economic Policy Management (PEPM) at Columbia University since January 2007. He is a research associate at the National Bureau of Economic Research (NBER). He is the former chief economist of the Inter-American Development Bank (2001–2006), president of the Latin American and Caribbean Economic Association, LACEA, 2000–2001, and president of the International Economic Association, IEA, 2005–2008. He graduated with a Ph.D. from Yale in 1974.

He was professor of economics at Columbia University (1973–1986), the University of Pennsylvania (1986–1989), and distinguished university professor at the University of Maryland (1993–2006). He was senior advisor in the Research Department of the IMF (1988–1993), and afterwards advised several governments in Latin America and Eastern Europe.

His award and honors include the following: Fellow of the National Academy of Economic Sciences (Argentina), since 1993. Fellow of the Econometric Society, since 1995. King Juan Carlos Prize in Economics, October 2000. Fellow of the American Academy of Arts and Sciences, since 2005. The Latin America and Caribbean Association (LACEA) Carlos Diaz Alejandro Prize, 2006. Doctor Honoris Causa, Di Tella University, Buenos Aires, Argentina, 2012. On April 15–16, 2004, the Research Department of the IMF sponsored a conference in his honor. He is the only economist to have named a fairy after him.

Calvo showed his commitment to narrowing the gap between academic and practitioners by splitting his time between academia and international financial institutions. In the latter, he was instrumental in helping to set up world class research departments in the International Monetary Fund (where he was a Senior Advisor during 1990–1992) and the Inter-American Development Bank (where he was the Chief Economist during 2001–2006). His IMF research on the relevance of external factors and the bond market, led eventually to a refocusing of the analysis in the IMF area departments, paying more attention to external financial conditions, and maturity and currency denomination of public and private debt (for further details, see the various Interviews in the list of references).

== Contributions to economics ==
Calvo's research covers a wide variety of issues. The focus of his current research is Emerging Market economies (EMs). Calvo's work aims at incorporating financial sector issues in macroeconomic models and emphasizes the role of external factors in EMs. His research has helped to highlight factors that received renewed attention in the context of the subprime crisis. His contributions remain widely cited in academic and policy circles, such as his 1988 "Servicing the Public Debt: The Role of Expectations" and his 1991 "Perils of Sterilization."

The Calvo pricing approach widely used by global central banks is named after him. It is one way of modelling sticky prices for example in New Keynesian DSGE-models (compare Calvo (staggered) contracts).

Expressions like "Calvo equation," "Sudden Stop," "Fear of Floating" – found in, or linked to, his papers – are common currency in the financial jargon. Several EMs have benefited from his research showing the severe risks imposed by the combination of high current account deficit, "dollarization," and financial contagion. This line of research led several economies in Latin America to taking defensive action and, thus, to navigate through the Lehman crisis without plunging into deep and long-lasting crisis, as was the case in other economies that exhibited large current account deficits (e.g., Iceland and the Baltic economies).

Calvo has published several books and over 100 journal articles. Selected contributions follow

1. Equilibrium Indeterminacy or Sunspot Equilibriums

- 1a."On the Indeterminacy of Interest Rates and Wages with Perfect Foresight," Journal of Economic Theory, December 1978.

This paper is a frontrunner in the theory of Sunspot Equilibrium. It shows that a conventional overlapping-generations model can give rise to equilibrium multiplicity and, moreover, that the latter phenomenon is more likely to arise if the propensity to save is relatively inelastic with respect to the real interest rate, a case akin to that emphasized in Keynes's General Theory.

2. Unemployment and Efficiency Wages

- 2a."Quasi-Walrasian Theories of Unemployment," Proceedings of the American Economic Association, American Economic Review, May 1979.
- 2b."The Inefficiency of Unemployment: The Supervision Perspective," Quarterly Journal of Economics, May 1985.

These papers show examples in which incomplete labor contracts could give rise to unemployment. The AER 1978 paper (Ref. 2a) is a seminal paper in this field and predates by more than five years the celebrated paper by Carl Shapiro and Joseph Stiglitz ("Equilibrium Unemployment as a Worker Discipline Device," in: American Economic Review 1984, p. 433–444). Ref. 2b further shows that this type of unemployment equilibrium is Pareto inefficient, and can be improved upon by fiscal policy. This is another 'first' in this literature.

3. Time Inconsistency and Credibility Issues

- 3a."On the Time Consistency of Optimal Policy in a Monetary Economy," Econometrica, November 1978. Reprinted in Rational Expectations and Econometric Practice, edited by R.E. Lucas Jr. and T.J. Sargent (Minneapolis: University of Minnesota Press, 1981).
- 3b."Temporary Stabilization: Predetermined Exchange Rates," Journal of Political Economy, December 1986.

These are papers in the area of "policy credibility." The Econometrica 1978 Time Inconsistency paper (Ref. 3a) follows on the lines of the paper by Finn E. Kydland and Edward C. Prescott (for which the authors deservedly got a Nobel Prize. According to Calvo (in his book Money, Exchange Rate and Output, MIT Press 1996), his research was independent and he only became aware of the Kydland-Prescott paper when his paper was about to be accepted for publication (Prescott was one of the referees). In contrast with the Kydland-Prescott paper, Calvo's starts from standard micro-foundations in a Patinkin-Sidrauski economy. However, the paper's major value added was not so much getting an alternative proof of Time Inconsistency but, rather, proving that time inconsistency holds even if the government aims at maximizing social welfare. This is a fundamental result because it dispels any doubt one might have that time inconsistency follows from just the government trying to cheat the public by making promises that it does not intend to honor.

Calvo’s Time Inconsistency paper was the first step in a research program involving credibility issues. Ref. 3b sets the grounds for the conjecture that inflation stabilization is especially hard to achieve and enhances social costs if policymakers cannot convey a credible message that they are willing and able to implement the necessary policies to secure lower and more stable inflation. Prior to this paper, the dominant explanation for costly price stabilization programs relied on mechanical factors like adaptive expectations/Phillips curve. An advantage of Calvo's approach is that it highlights the relevance of central banks' ability to communicate with the public and the importance of getting strong support from the rest of the government and political apparatus, even though individuals are fully rational. Ref. 3b spawned a large literature dealing with EMs.

4. Supervision and Wage Distribution at the Firm

- 4a."Hierarchy, Ability and Income Distribution," with S. Wellisz, Journal of Political Economy, October 1979.

The 1979 JPE paper (Ref. 4a), contains a model examining the implications of imperfect information within the firm on the firm's wage distribution. This paper received considerable attention; it provides one of the earliest frameworks that help to explain, for instance, why a CEO can earn multiples of his/her underlings' salaries. The supervision technology in this paper is similar to the one utilized in Ref. 2 in connection with the issue of efficiency wages. The two key assumption are "loss of control" – which give rise to a hierarchical supervisory firm structure – and costly supervision. The combination of these two factors is shown to imply that the wage rate is a function of one's position in the hierarchy: the closer to the top of the hierarchical ladder, the higher the wage, even if individuals are, to all intents and purposes, identical. Ref. 2 & 4 are two outstanding examples of Calvo's research inspired by the conjecture that salient macro phenomena could be rooted in frictions within firms, a conjecture linked to the pioneering papers by Edmund Phelps et al.

5. Sticky Prices

- 5a."Staggered Contracts in a Utility-Maximizing Framework," Journal of Monetary Economics, September 1983.

This paper ranks first in Calvo's citations (more than 5700 citations according to Google Scholar, henceforth GM). The approach was first developed to clarify price stabilization puzzles in EMs, but was eventually incorporated as a fundamental component in New Keynesian economics. It does not involve an original idea, which hails back to papers by Edmund Phelps and John B. Taylor. The main value added is 'simplicity.' The paper continues to be a key assumption in central banks' monetary models — where it is usually referred to as 'the Calvo Equation'.

6. Public Debt

- 6a."Servicing the Public Debt: The Role of Expectations," American Economic Review, September 1988.

This paper shows that under incomplete capital markets, public debt can give rise to multiple equilibriums which can be Pareto ranked. In the 'bad' equilibrium interest rates are high and lead to counterproductive behavior, e.g., high inflation or debt default; while in the 'good' equilibrium none of the latter takes place. The AER 1988 paper was motivated by stubborn high inflation in Brazil, despite low public debt and positive primary fiscal surplus. According to the paper this situation may result from a long record of high inflation that lead individuals to disbelieve official stabilization announcements, keeping interest rates high. The latter feeds into high fiscal deficit, validating high-inflation expectations – even under rational expectations. These ideas have acquired new significance in the present EU crisis. In this case, default, not high inflation, is at the heart of the debate. However, the model can also be applied (as shown in the original Calvo paper). This has led to active research in this subfield, and already appears to have guided ECB policy of trying to keep sovereign debt interest rates low by promising to purchase 'unlimited' amounts of public debt obligations in the euro zone. This is another example of the relevance of Calvo's research in the debate of central policy issues.

7. International Capital Markets

- 7a."Capital Inflows and Real Exchange Rate Appreciation in Latin America: The Role of External Factors," with L. Leiderman and C. Reinhart, Staff Papers, March 1993.
- 7b."Varieties of Capital-Market Crises," in G. Calvo and M. King (eds.) The Debt Burden and its Consequences for Monetary Policy, Macmillan, 1998. Also in G. Calvo Emerging Capital Markets in Turmoil: Bad Luck or Bad Policy?, Cambridge, Massachusetts: MIT Press 2005.
- 7c."Capital Flows and Capital-Market Crises: The Simple Economics of Sudden Stops," Journal of Applied Economics, November 1998. Also in G. Calvo Emerging Capital Markets in Turmoil: Bad Luck or Bad Policy?, Cambridge, Massachusetts: MIT Press 2005.
- 7d."Explaining Sudden Stops, Growth Collapse and BOP Crises: The case of distortionary output taxes", IMF Mundell-Fleming Lecture, IMF Staff Papers, 2003. Also in G. Calvo Emerging Capital Markets in Turmoil: Bad Luck or Bad Policy?, Cambridge, Massachusetts: MIT Press 2005
- 7e."Fear of Floating"(with C. Reinhart), Quarterly Journal of Economics, 2002. Also in G. Calvo Emerging Capital Markets in Turmoil: Bad Luck or Bad Policy?, Cambridge, Massachusetts: MIT Press 2005.
- 7f.Calvo, Guillermo, Alejandro Izquierdo and Luis-Fernando Mejia, 2008, "Systemic Sudden Stop: The Relevance of Balance-Sheet Effects and Financial Integration," NBER Working Paper No. 14026.

This is a short list of Calvo's papers focused on capital flows and financial crises. It is an area in which Calvo is still actively engaged. His first papers go back to the early 1980s, but his research on these topic took flight after the Mexican Tequila crisis in 1994/5 triggered by a sudden increase in US interest rates. Ref. 7b highlighting the relevance of the balance-sheet approach for understanding some of the puzzling dynamics of financial crisis, an issue that had so far been largely obliterated in the literature. This paper was circulated soon after that episode and helped to set the stage for sharply different explanations from the one offered in the seminal paper on the mechanics of balance of payment crisis by Paul Krugman. Ref.7c crowned this effort by defining and offering some simple but fundamental rationalization for a new concept that since then has become part of the economists’ jargon in the discussion of financial crises, namely, ‘Sudden Stop’. The paper focuses on large and largely unexpected declines in capital inflows, a characteristic of all major crises in EMs since at least the 1990s. Sudden Stop and empirical analyses carried out in 7f have become familiar staple in the literature that now stretches beyond EU.

Ref 7e shows that despite fixed exchange rates being singled out as a major factor in EM crises in the 1990s, governments in those economies continue 'pegging' their currencies in one way or another. This is an empirical paper which is still very visible and has more than 3100 citations according to GS. Finally, 7a is another empirical paper showing that capital inflows in Latin America are highly sensitive to external factors. The paper is widely cited (more than 1450 citations according to GS) and has become highly topical in the current conjuncture.

== Interviews ==
1. Enrique G. Mendoza, 2005, "Toward and Economic Theory of Reality: An Interview with Guillermo A. Calvo," Macroeconomic Dynamics, 9, pp. 123–145. http://www.columbia.edu/~gc2286/documents/interview.pdf.
2. James L. Rowe, 2007, "A Master of Theory and Practice," Finance and Development, March, 44, 1. http://www.imf.org/external/pubs/ft/fandd/2007/03/people.htm
3. (in Spanish). Juan Carlos De Pablo, 2006, "Entrevista a Guillermo Antonio Roberto Calvo," Instituto de Economía y Finanzas. Facultad de Ciencias Económicas, Universidad de Córdoba.
