= Laurence M. Ball =

American economist

- Born: March 19, 1959 (age 67); Boston, Massachusetts
- Occupations: economist, college educator
- Years active: 1986-present
- Known for: macroeconomics, New Keynesian Economic Theory

Academic background
- Education: Amherst College; Massachusetts Institute of Technology

Laurence M. Ball (born March 19, 1959) is an American economist and Professor at the Zanvyl Krieger School of Arts and Sciences of Johns Hopkins University in Baltimore, Maryland. He is a specialist in the field of macroeconomics.

== Education and career ==
Born in Boston, Massachusetts, he attended Groveton High School in Fairfax County, Virginia and received a Bachelor of Arts degree in economics in 1980 from Amherst College, then a Doctor of Economics degree in 1986 from the Massachusetts Institute of Technology, where he was the recipient of graduate fellowships from the National Science Foundation (1981–1982, 1983–1985). He was assistant professor of economics at the Graduate School of Business Administration at New York University from 1985 to 1989 and assistant professor of economics at Princeton University from 1989 to 1994. He was appointed professor of economics at Johns Hopkins University in 1994 and was department chairman from 2015 to 2019. He was Professorial Fellow in Monetary Economics, Victoria University of Wellington and Reserve Bank of New Zealand in 1996 and a visiting professor of economics at Harvard University in the autumn of 2008. He received a Houblon-Norman Fellowship from the Bank of England in 2000–2001 and a Wim Duisenberg Fellowship from the European Central Bank in 2019.

He has been a visiting scholar at reserve banks in numerous countries, including the Federal Reserve Bank of Philadelphia (1991–1993), the Bank of Italy (1993), the US Federal Reserve Board of Governors (1993, 1996, 1999, 2008), the Federal Reserve Bank of Kansas City (1995–2000), the Reserve Bank of Australia (1996–1997), the Central Bank of Norway (1999), the Bank of Japan (2002), the Hong Kong Monetary Authority (2001–2002), and the Federal Reserve Bank of Boston (2009).

Ball is a research associate at the National Bureau of Economic Research, an Honorary Senior Fellow at the Rimini Centre for Economic Analysis, a visiting scholar in the Research Department of the International Monetary Fund, and an Honorary Senior Fellow of the International Centre for Economic Analysis.

== Works ==
He became an associate editor for the magazine Open Economies Review in 2009, has authored 4 books and more than 50 articles and papers on economics. His 2010 book The Fed and Lehman Brothers: Setting the Record Straight on a Financial Disaster was harshly critical of the Federal Reserve and its role in the collapse of Lehman Brothers during the economic crisis of 2008.

His current research is focused on the long term effects of the Great Recession and the case being made for raising central banks inflation targets to four percent.

== Publications ==
- Ball, Laurence M. The Fed and Lehman Brothers: Setting the Record Straight on a Financial Disaster. Cambridge, United Kingdom: Cambridge University Press, 2018.
- Ball, Laurence M. Money, Banking, and Financial Markets. New York, NY: Worth Publishers, 2012.
  - Chinese translation by Jing Liu, and Yuan He. Bao'er huo bi jin rong xue. Beijing: Zhongguo ren min da xue chu ban she, 2012.
