= Marginal =

Marginal may refer to:

- Marginal (album), the third album of the Belgian rock band Dead Man Ray, released in 2001
- Marginal (manga)
- El Marginal, Argentine TV series
- Marginal seat or marginal constituency or marginal, in politics

== See also ==
=== Economics ===
- Marginalism
- Marginal analysis
- Marginal concepts
- Marginal cost
- Marginal demand
- Marginal product
- Marginal product of labor
- Marginal propensity to consume
- Marginal rate of substitution
- Marginal use
- Marginal utility
- Marginal rate

=== Other ===
- Margin (disambiguation)
- Marginalization
- Marginal intra-industry trade, where the change in a country's exports are essentially of the same products as its change in imports
- Marginal land, land that is of little value because of its unsuitability for growing crops and other uses
- Marginal model, in hierarchical linear modeling
- Marginal observables, in physics; see Renormalization group
- Marginal person, in sociology; see Marginalization
- Marginal plant, see Bog garden
- Marginal probability or Marginal distribution, in probability theory
- Marginal sea, commonly has two differing meanings
- Marginal seat, a constituency held with a small majority in an election
- Marginal sulcus, a portion of the cingulate sulcus of the brain
- Marginal zone B-cell, noncirculating mature B cells that segregate anatomically into the marginal zone (MZ) of the spleen
