= Economic region of production =

Economic theory stemming from the theory of production

In economics and microeconomics, the economic region of production is an offshoot of the theory of production function with two variables. It is a cost-oriented theory which defines the region in which the optimal factor combination will lie. It serves as a map of the region of optimal production. Economic region of production consist of negatively sloped portion of all isoquants.

== Basic theory ==
Production lines Q1 and Q2 are the isoquants, depicting the technically efficient factor combinations at different levels of production. The ridge lines A and B demarcate the technically efficient region of production. Above the line OA and below the line OB slope of the isoquants is positive which means that increases in both capital and labour are required to produce a given fixed quantity of output. The ridge lines are the combination of points where marginal product (MP_{LK}) of one of the factors is zero.

The theory entails that there is a limit to how much one factor can be substituted for another. When production reaches a point where substitution between the factors becomes impossible (MP_{LK}), the isoquant becomes positively sloping. No rational entrepreneur will operate at a point outside the ridge lines (Region of Economic Nonsense).

== See also ==
- Distribution (economics)
- History of microeconomics
- Production (economics)
- Production theory basics
- Productivity
- Productivity model
