= Margin =

Margin may refer to:

== Physical or graphical edges ==
- Margin (typography), the white space that surrounds the content of a page
- Continental margin, the zone of the ocean floor that separates the thin oceanic crust from thick continental crust
- Leaf margin, the edge of a leaf
- Resection margin, the tissue near a tumor that is removed to ensure that no cancer cells are left behind

== Economics and finance ==
- Margin of profit, the fraction of revenue that is left after paying expenses
- Margin (economics), a set of constraints conceptualised as a border
- Margin (finance), a type of financial collateral used to cover credit risk
- Contribution margin
- Gross margin

== Figurative edges ==
- Margin (machine learning), the distance between a decision boundary and a data point
- Marginal frequency distribution, in statistics (Frequency distribution § Joint frequency distributions)

== Other uses ==
- Margins (film), a 2022 Italian film by Niccolò Falsetti
- The Margin (album), a 1985 album by Peter Hammill
- The Margin (film), a 1976 French film by Walerian Borowczyk
- The Margin (novel), a 1967 novel by André Pieyre de Mandiargues; basis for the film
- Margasin, or Margin, a village in Qazvin Province, Iran
- USS Margin, a US Navy patrol boat 1918–1919

== See also ==
- Margin Call, a 2011 film
- Margin of safety (disambiguation)
- margin of victory at Wiktionary
- Marginal (disambiguation)
