= Anke-Eve Goldmann =

German journalist and racer (born 1929)

- Born: 27 November 1929 (age 95); Berlin, Germany
- Occupation(s): Language teacher, journalist, racer
- Known for: Inspirational woman motorcyclist and designer

Anke-Eve Goldmann (born 27 November 1929) is a German journalist for Cycle World, Das Motorrad in Germany, Moto Revue in France and other international motorcycle magazines. Goldmann was a friend of author André Pieyre de Mandiargues and the inspiration for the main character, 'Rebecca', in his most popular book The Motorcycle (1963). The book was adapted for the 1968 film The Girl on a Motorcycle starring Marianne Faithfull. From the 1950s, she competed in endurance and circuit racing, at the Nürburgring and Hockenheimring but being a woman, was barred from higher level competitions.

Goldmann taught German to airmen's children at a U.S. Air Force base in Germany. She was the first woman to ride a motorcycle with a one-piece leather racing suit, made for her by German manufacturer Harro. She rode BMW motorcycles and became a spokesperson for the marque before buying an MV Agusta.

In 1958, she helped found the Women's International Motorcycle Association in Europe.

Goldmann gave up motorcycling after the death of a close friend.
