= Marginal concepts =

Economic concepts based on incremental change

In economics, marginal concepts are associated with a specific change in the quantity used of a good or service, as opposed to some notion of the over-all significance of that class of good or service, or of some total quantity thereof.

== Marginality ==
Constraints are conceptualized as a border or margin. The location of the margin for any individual corresponds to his or her endowment, broadly conceived to include opportunities. This endowment is determined by many things including physical laws (which constrain how forms of energy and matter may be transformed), accidents of nature (which determine the presence of natural resources), and the outcomes of past decisions made both by others and by the individual himself or herself.

A value that holds true given particular constraints is a marginal value. A change that would be affected as or by a specific loosening or tightening of those constraints is a marginal change, as large as the smallest relevant division of that good or service. For reasons of tractability, it is often assumed in neoclassical analysis that goods and services are continuously divisible. In such context, a marginal change may be an infinitesimal change or a limit. However, strictly speaking, the smallest relevant division may be quite large.

== Some important marginal concepts ==
The marginal use of a good or service is the specific use to which an agent would put a given increase, or the specific use of the good or service that would be abandoned in response to a given decrease.

The marginal utility of a good or service is the utility of the specific use to which an agent would put a given increase in that good or service, or of the specific use that would be abandoned in response to a given decrease. In other words, marginal utility is the utility of the marginal use.

The marginal rate of substitution is the rate of substitution that is the least favorable rate, at the margin, at which an agent is willing to exchange units of one good or service for units of another.

A marginal benefit is a benefit (howsoever ranked or measured) associated with a marginal change.

The term “marginal cost” may refer to an opportunity cost at the margin, or more narrowly to marginal pecuniary cost — that is to say marginal cost measured by forgone cash flow.

Other marginal concepts include (but are not limited to):

- marginal physical product (sometimes also known as “marginal product”)
  - marginal product of labor
  - marginal product of capital
- marginal rate of transformation, the rate at which one output or result must be sacrificed in order to increase another output or result
- marginal revenue product
- marginal propensity to save and consume
- marginal tax rate
- marginal efficiency of capital

Marginalism is the use of marginal concepts to explain economic phenomena.

The related concept of elasticity is the ratio of the incremental percentage change in one variable with respect to an incremental percentage change in another variable.
