= The Margin (film) =

1976 film

- Directed by: Walerian Borowczyk
- Based on: The Margin, novel by André Pieyre de Mandiargues
- Produced by: Raymond Hakim; Robert Hakim
- Starring: Sylvia Kristel; Joe Dallesandro; André Falcon; Mireille Audibert; Denis Canuel
- Cinematography: Bernard Daillencourt
- Edited by: Louisette Hautecoeur
- Color process: Eastmancolor
- Production company: Paris Film Productions
- Distributed by: Robert et Raymond Hakim
- Release date: 22 September 1976
- Running time: 86 minutes
- Country: France
- Language: French

The Margin (French: La Marge, also known as The Streetwalker and Emmanuelle 77) is a 1976 French erotic drama film written and directed by Walerian Borowczyk and starring Sylvia Kristel, Joe Dallesandro, André Falcon, Mireille Audibert and Denis Canuel.

It is loosely based on the novel The Margin by André Pieyre de Mandiargues.

It had admissions of 725,502 in France.

== Plot ==
On business in Paris, a happily-married man receives news of the death of his wife and becomes emotionally involved with a prostitute, ultimately committing suicide.

== Cast ==
- Sylvia Kristel as Diana
- Joe Dallesandro as Sigismond Pons
- André Falcon as Antonin Pons
- Mireille Audibert as Sergine Pons
- Denis Canuel as Le Moustachu
- Dominique Marcas as Herself
- Norma Picadilly as The Stripper
- Camille Larivière as Herself (credited as Camille Lariviere)
- Luz Laurent as Herself
- Louise Chevalier as Feline
- Karin Albin as Herself
- Jean Lara as Himself
- Carlo Nell as Himself
- Dominique Erlanger as Herself
- Sylvaine Charlet as Herself
- Isabelle Mercanton as Herself
