= Icor =

ICOR may refer to:

== Abbreviations ==
- Incremental capital-output ratio
- Input, Control, Output, Resources, a standard model for the definition of processes related to IDEF0
- Instant centre of rotation
- UAB ICOR, companies group in Lithuania
- iCOR Impact, Impact Classroom Observation Resource, an educational software designed for classroom observations

== See also ==
- Ichor, a mineral that is the Greek gods' blood
- Organization for Jewish Colonization in Russia (ICOR, IKOR)
