= Dominique Marcas =

French actress (1920–2022)

- Born: 8 August 1920; Dozulé, France
- Died: 15 February 2022 (aged 101); Illiers-l'Évêque, Eure, France
- Occupation: Actress
- Years active: 1950–2014

Dominique Marcas (8 August 1920 – 15 February 2022) was a French actress. She appeared in more than 140 films and television shows from 1950 to 2014. Marcas starred in the film Where Is Madame Catherine?, which was entered into the Un Certain Regard section at the 2003 Cannes Film Festival. She died in Illiers-l'Évêque, Eure, on 15 February 2022, at the age of 101.

== Selected filmography ==
- Gunman in the Streets (uncredited, 1950)
- Justice Is Done (uncredited, 1950)
- The Lovers of Marianne (1953)
- Women of Paris (1953)
- The Hunchback of Notre Dame (uncredited, 1956)
- Liza (1972)
- La Marge (1976)
- The Island of Thirty Coffins (1979)
- Docteur Petiot (1990)
- La Vie de bohème (1992)
- Where Is Madame Catherine? (2003)
- Mozart's Sister (2010)
