= Where Is Madame Catherine? =

2003 film

- Directed by: Marc Recha
- Written by: Marc Recha; Nadine Lamari; Mireia Vidal
- Produced by: Luis Miñarro
- Starring: Dominique Marcas
- Cinematography: Helene louvart
- Edited by: Ernest Blasi
- Release date: 5 September 2003
- Running time: 130 minutes
- Countries: France; Spain
- Languages: French; Catalan

Where Is Madame Catherine? (Catalan: Les mans buides, Spanish: Las manos vacías, French: Les mains vides) is a 2003 French-Spanish comedy film directed by Marc Recha. It was entered into the Un Certain Regard section at the 2003 Cannes Film Festival.

== Cast ==
- Dominique Marcas - Madame Catherine
- Jérémie Lippmann - Axel
- Olivier Gourmet - Eric
- Eduardo Noriega - Gerard
- Jeanne Favre - Lola
- Sébastien Viala - Philippe
- Rajko Nikolic - Monsieur Georges
- Eulalia Ramón - Maria
- Mireille Perrier - Sophie
- Mireia Ros - Anna
- Pierre Berriau - Yann
- Luis Hostalot - Jean-Claude
- Francesc Tollet - Octave

== See also ==
- List of French films of 2003
- List of Spanish films of 2003
