= Incremental capital-output ratio =

Ratio of how much additional investment is needed to generate one unit of extra output

The Incremental Capital-Output Ratio (ICOR) is the ratio of investment to growth which is equal to the reciprocal of the marginal product of capital. The higher the ICOR, the lower the productivity of capital or the marginal efficiency of capital. The ICOR can be thought of as a measure of the inefficiency with which capital is used. In most countries the ICOR is in the neighborhood of 3. It is a topic discussed in economic growth. It can be expressed in the following formula, where K is capital output ratio, Y is output (GDP), and I is net investment.

$\text{Incremental Capital Output Ratio (ICOR)} = \frac{\Delta K}{\Delta Y} = \frac{\frac{\Delta K}{Y}}{\frac{\Delta Y}{Y}}= \frac{\frac{I}{Y}}{\frac{\Delta Y}{Y}}$

According to this formula the incremental capital output ratio can be computed by dividing the investment share in GDP by the rate of growth of GDP. As an example, if the level of investment (as a share of GDP) in a developing country had been (approximately) 20% over a particular period, and if the growth rate of GDP had been (approximately) 5% per year during the same period, then the ICOR would be 20/5 = 4.

== ICOR, world, and determining variables ==
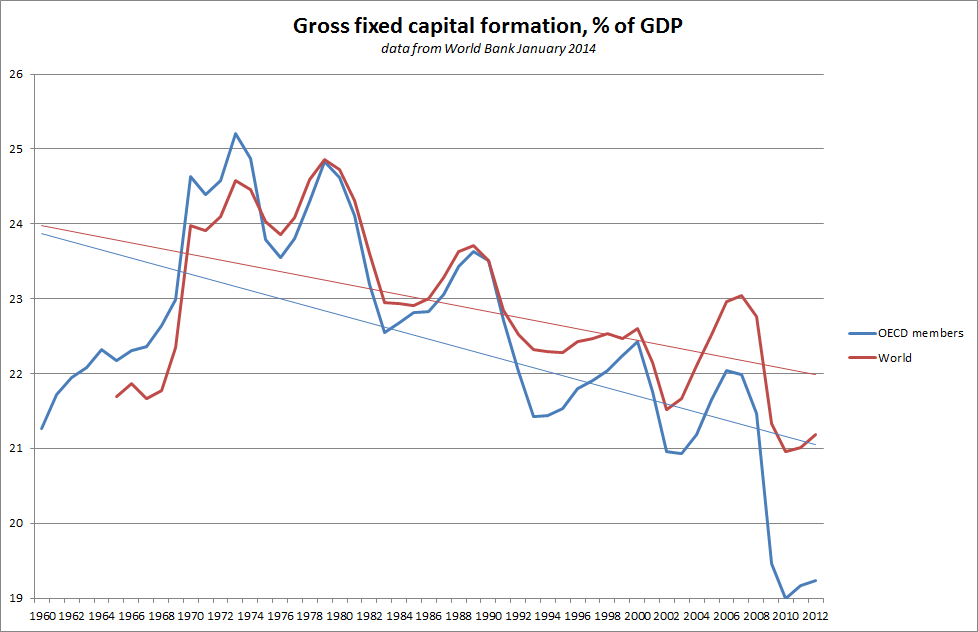
Investment share

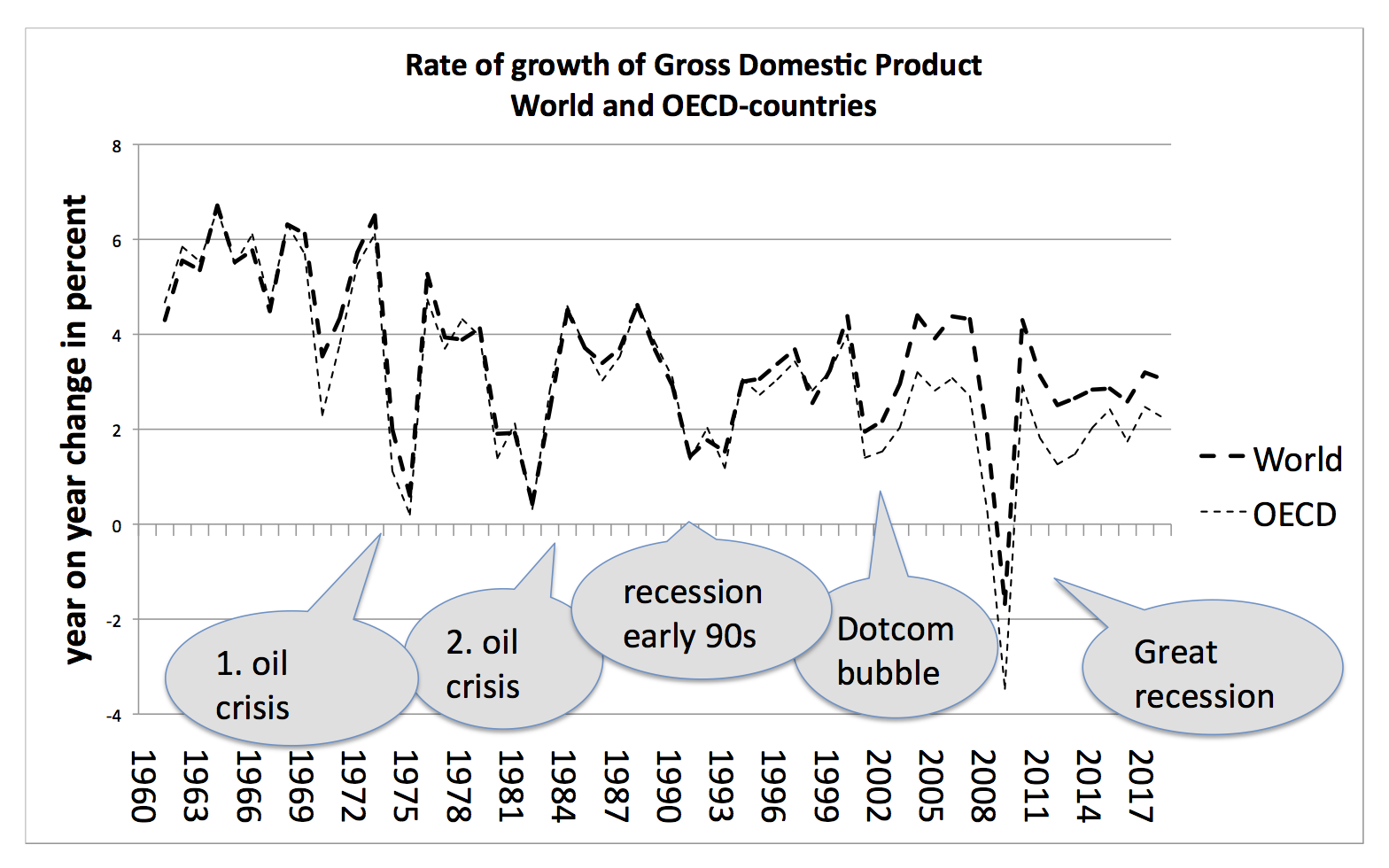
Rate of GDP growth

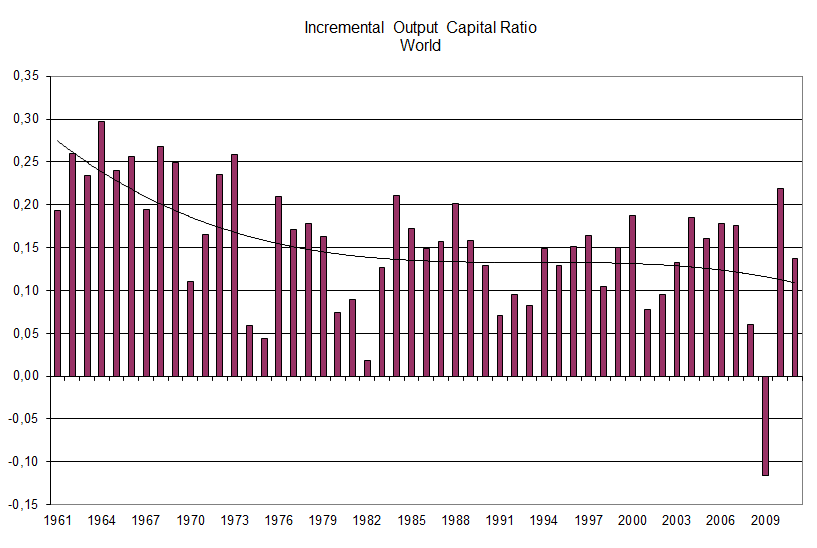
The reciprocal of ICOR

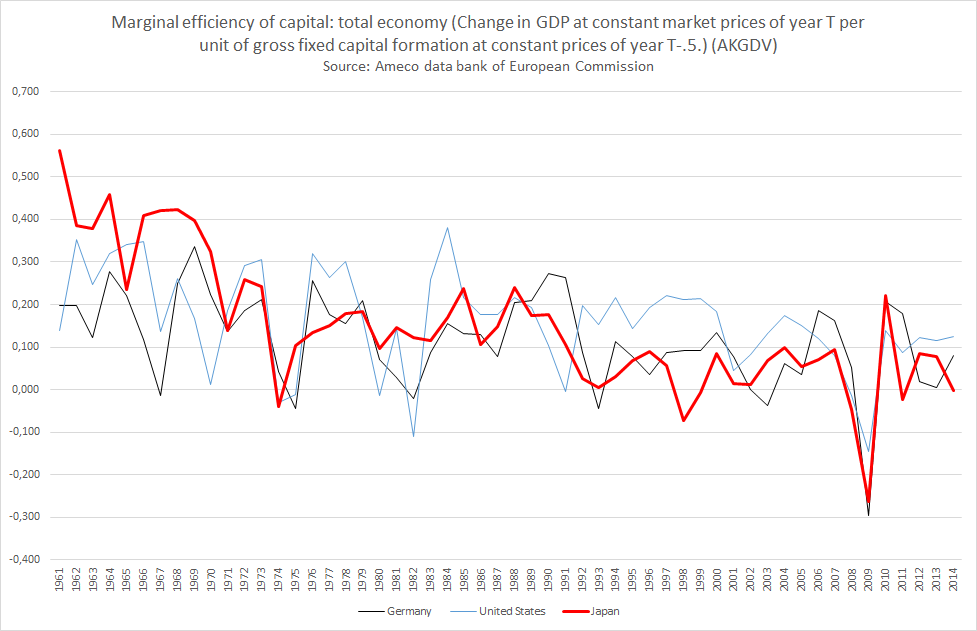
Marginal efficiency of capital as defined in the Ameco data bank of the European Commission for FRG, USA and Japan.
