= Household analogy =

Political analogy

The household analogy, also known as the household fallacy or the government/household analogy, refers to rhetoric in political economic discourse that compares the finances of a government to those of a household. The analogy has frequently been made in debates about government debt, with proponents arguing that government debt can be analogized as household debt, and critics arguing that they are not comparable.

The analogy has been characterized by economists as misleading and false, as the functions and constraints of governments and households are vastly dissimilar. Differences include that governments can print money, interest rates on government borrowing may be cheaper than individual borrowing, governments can increase their budgets through taxation, governments have indefinite planning horizons, national debt may be held primarily domestically (the equivalent of household members owing each other), governments typically have greater collateral for borrowing, and contractions in government spending can cause or prolong economic crises and increase the debt of the government. For governments, the main risks of overspending may revolve around inflation rather than the size of the debt per se.

Economist and Nobel laureate William Vickrey, stated in 1998:

This fallacy seems to stem from a false analogy to borrowing by individuals. Current reality is almost the exact opposite. Deficits add to the net disposable income of individuals, to the extent that government disbursements that constitute income to recipients exceed that abstracted from disposable income in taxes, fees, and other charges. This added purchasing power, when spent, provides markets for private production, inducing producers to invest in additional plant capacity, which will form part of the real heritage left to the future. This is in addition to whatever public investment takes place in infrastructure, education, research, and the like. Larger deficits, sufficient to recycle savings out of a growing gross domestic product (GDP) in excess of what can be recycled by profit-seeking private investment, are not an economic sin but an economic necessity. Deficits in excess of a gap growing as a result of the maximum feasible growth in real output might indeed cause problems, but we are nowhere near that level. Even the analogy itself is faulty. If General Motors, AT&T, and individual households had been required to balance their budgets in the manner being applied to the Federal government, there would be no corporate bonds, no mortgages, no bank loans, and many fewer automobiles, telephones, and houses.

== See also ==
- Economics terminology that differs from common usage
