= Marginal land =

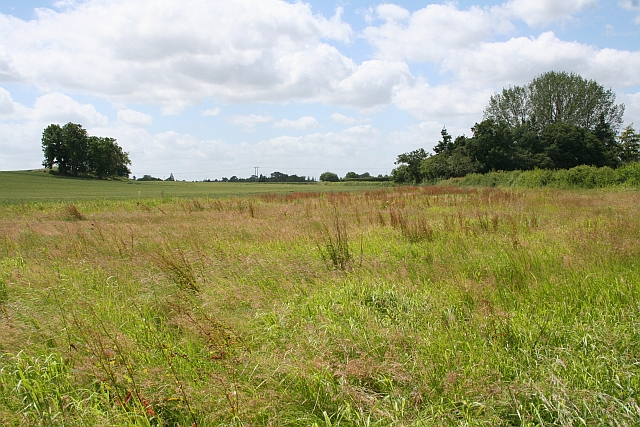
Marginal land near the A4104 road in Great Britain.

Marginal land is land that is of little agricultural or developmental value because crops produced from the area would be worth less than any rent paid for access to the area. Although the term marginal is often used in a subjective sense for less-than-ideal lands, it is fundamentally an economic term that is defined by the local economic context. Thus what constitutes marginal land varies both with location and over time: for example, "a soil profile with a set of specific biophysical characteristics reported as "marginal" in the US corn belt may be one of the better soils available in another context". In the context of bioenergy, marginal land is often redefined to include land that is not only economically suboptimal but also constrained by poor biophysical conditions (e.g., shallow rooting depth, low fertility, drainage issues) or declining productivity trends. Such land may be underused in conventional agriculture but holds potential for alternative crops like perennials or bioenergy systems.Changes in product values – such as the ethanol-demand induced spike in corn prices – can result in formerly marginal lands becoming profitable. Marginal lands can therefore be more difficult to delineate as compared to "abandoned crop lands" which reflect more clearly definable landowner-initiated land use changes. Biophysical, land-use-based, and economic marginality have been distinguished, along with the broader concept of "socially marginal land," defined as land that yields near-zero returns once environmental externalities are considered.

Land may be marginal for a number of reasons, including poor water supply, poor soil quality, pollution from previous industrial activities, terrain challenges such as excessive slope, or excessive distance from means of transportation.

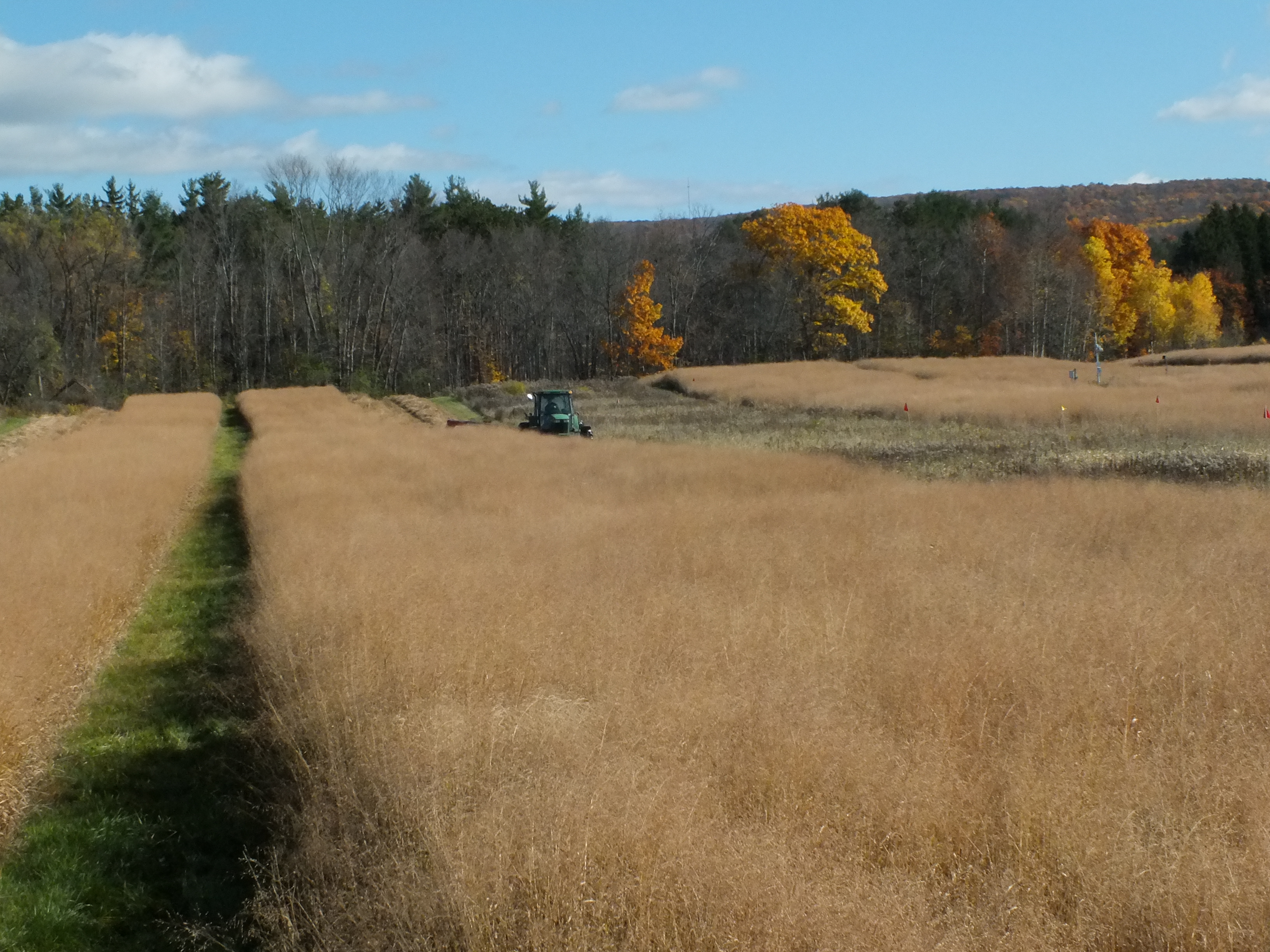
Switchgrass production on marginal land. Experimental plots being mowed for harvest at Cornell University in November 2016. The mixed vegetation strip to the right of the tractor shows the lower productivity of the fallow grassland that covered the site prior to planting of switchgrass in 2011.

Marginal land is not entirely useless for human purposes. For example, certain breeds of free-roaming livestock, such as the English Leicester sheep, are able to forage on such land. There are also some plants that can be grown in land that would be considered marginal for most agricultural uses. For example, Cucurbita foetidissima, the buffalo gourd, is well adapted to marginal agricultural lands such as sandy loam soils which have to be well-drained. Land that is marginal for conventional row-crop production is often well-suited to perennial crops, including low-input crops grown as bioenergy or bioproduct feedstocks such as switchgrass (Panicum virgatum), shrub willow (Salix spp.), and giant miscanthus (Miscanthus x giganteus), allowing production of these crops without inducing competition for prime farmlands.
