= Margin of safety =

Margin of safety may refer to:

- Margin of safety (financial) in a financial context
- Margin of safety (medicine) for pharmaceutical drugs
- Margin of safety (accounting) in cost accounting
- Margin of safety (engineering) in structural engineering
- Margin of Safety (book), by Seth Klarman
