= Margasin =

Margasin مرگسين
- Village
- Location within Iran
- Coordinates: 36°13′08″N 49°37′23″E
- Country: Iran
- Province: Qazvin
- County: Takestan
- Bakhsh: Central
- Rural District: Qaqazan-e Sharqi

Population (2006)
  - Total: 278
- Time zone: UTC+3:30 (IRST)
  - Summer (DST): UTC+4:30 (IRDT)

Margasin (Persian: مرگسين, also Romanized as Margasīn; also known as Margīn) is a village in Qaqazan-e Sharqi Rural District, in the Central District of Takestan County, Qazvin Province, Iran. At the 2006 census, its population was 278, in 69 families.
