= Motorrad (magazine) =

- Editor-in-chief: Michael Pfeiffer
- Categories: Motorcycle magazine
- Frequency: Biweekly
- Circulation: 135,000
- Publisher: Motor Presse Stuttgart
- First issue: October 4, 1903
- Company: Gruner + Jahr
- Country: Germany
- Based in: Stuttgart
- Language: German
- Website: www.motorradonline.de
- ISSN: 0027-237X

Motorrad (German for motorcycle) is a German magazine about motorcycles and motorcycling. With an average circulation of approximately 135,000 copies it is Europe's largest magazine for this target audience. The magazine is part of Gruner + Jahr. It is published biweekly by the publishing house Motor Presse Stuttgart. The editor-in-chief is Michael Pfeiffer.

A unique feature of the publication is its motorcycle tests (single, comparison and long-term) over several tens of thousands of kilometers (in the column test and technology). Other columns include service, using purchase, on the way (with travel descriptions and tips), magazine and sport.

== History ==
The magazine Motorrad has a history spanning more than a century. On October 4, 1903 the first issue of Das Motorrad — die illustrierte Zeitschrift für die Gesamtinteressen der Motor-Radfahrer was printed by printing and publishing house Paul Förster. Starting in 1907, it was published under the title Der Motor — Gemeinschaftsorgan für Motorrad und Motorwagen. With the outbreak of the First World War in 1914, the magazine was suspended.

After some unsuccessful attempts of revival, the Berlin publishing house George Koenig took over with the title Das Motorrad. Under the direction of Paul Friedmann, the magazine experienced an upswing. In 1924 publication was changed from biweekly to weekly.

In 1933, as the publication was subjected to National Socialist Gleichschaltung ("coordination"), Paul Friedmann as editor-in-chief was replaced by the regime-faithful Gustav Müller. Three and a half years after the beginning of the Second World War, 20 March 1943, publication was halted. Subscribers received instead the National Socialist Motor Corps publication Deutsche Kraftfahrt, formerly published as so-called "community sheets" DDAC-Motorwelt, Allgemeine Automobilzeitung and Motor und Sport — forerunner of Auto, Motor und Sport — until 1944.

In 1949 Paul Pietsch, cofounder of Motor Presse Stuttgart, bought rights to the title Das Motorrad for 3000 Deutsche Marks; still in the same year the first issue appeared, in 1949 ten issues appeared in all. In the following year the publishing house moved from Freiburg im Breisgau to Stuttgart; Carl Hertweck becomes editor-in-chief. In 1951 publication changed from twice a month to biweekly. In 1954 starting from issue 11 the title changed to Das Motorrad + der Roller (The Motorcycle and Scooter) — however only until the end of 1954. Circulation reached 60,000. In 1958 Siegfried Rauch took over as editor-in-chief.

Starting from the late 1950s, the motorcycle industry generally found itself in a crisis, consumers aspiring to own a comfortable automobile. The circulation of Das Motorrad reached a low point, lasting until the mid-1960s, of 30,000.

In 1969, the release of modern four-stroke, four-cylinder engines, especially the Honda CB750, and the film Easy Rider ushered in a new motorcycle boom. Motorrad, now without the article "Das" in the title, reached a record circulation of 250,000 in 1976.

Further editors-in-chief were Helmut Luckner (1976–1983), Karl Maurer (1983–1985), Hans Joachim Nowitzki (1985–1989), Friedhelm Fiedler (1989–1996) und Walter Gottschick (until 1999).

Since 1997 the magazine has had a presence on the World Wide Web. Its English language website can be found at www.motorcycle-magazine.com.
