= André Pieyre de Mandiargues =

French novelist

- Born: 14 March 1909; Paris, France
- Died: 13 December 1991 (aged 82); France
- Occupation: Novelist
- Writing career
- Genre: Fiction

André Pieyre de Mandiargues (14 March 1909 – 13 December 1991) was a French writer born in Paris. He became an associate of the Surrealists and married the Italian painter Bona Tibertelli de Pisis (a niece of the Italian metaphysical painter Count Filippo Tibertelli de Pisis). He was a particularly close friend of the painter Leonor Fini.

His novel La Marge (1967; Eng: The Margin) won the Prix Goncourt and was made into a film of the same name by Walerian Borowczyk in 1976. It is his collection of pornographic items that is featured in Borowczyk's Une collection particulière. Borowczyk also used Mandiargues' work for the first story included in his anthology film Immoral Tales.

He also wrote an introduction to Anne Desclos's Story of O and was a signatory to the Manifesto of the 121.

His book Feu de braise (1959) was published in 1971 in an English translation by April FitzLyon called Blaze of Embers (Calder and Boyars, 1971).

His most popular book was The Motorcycle (1963), which was adapted for the 1968 film The Girl on a Motorcycle, starring a young Marianne Faithfull. Mandiargues was friends with motorcycle journalist Anke-Eve Goldmann, who was likely the inspiration for the main character 'Rebecca', as Goldmann was the first woman to ride a motorcycle with a one-piece leather racing suit, which she designed with German manufacturer Harro.

== Works ==
- Le Musée noir (1946)
- L'Anglais décrit dans le château fermé (1953)
- Le Lis de mer (1956)
- Le Belvédère (1958)
- Feu de braise (1959)
- La motocyclette (1963)
- La Marge (1967)
- Isabella Morra (1974)
- Tout disparaîtra (1987)
