= Marginal product of labor =

Change in output that results from employing an added unit of labor

In economics, the marginal product of labor (MP_{L}) is the change in output that results from employing an added unit of labor. It is a feature of the production function and depends on the amounts of physical capital and labor already in use.

== Definition ==
The marginal product of a factor of production is generally defined as the change in output resulting from a unit or infinitesimal change in the quantity of that factor used, holding all other input usages in the production process constant.

The marginal product of labor is then the change in output (Y) per unit change in labor (L). In discrete terms the marginal product of labor is:

$$\frac {\Delta Y} {\Delta L}.$$

In continuous terms, the MP_{L} is the first derivative of the production function:

$\frac {\partial Y} {\partial L}.$

Graphically, the MP_{L} is the slope of the production function.

== Examples ==
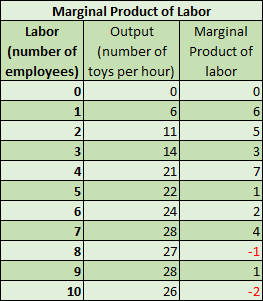
Marginal product of labor table

There is a factory which produces toys. When there are no workers in the factory, no toys are produced. When there is one worker in the factory, six toys are produced per hour. When there are two workers in the factory, eleven toys are produced per hour. There is a marginal product of labor of five when there are two workers in the factory compared to one. When the marginal product of labor is increasing, this is called increasing marginal returns. However, as the number of workers increases, the marginal product of labor may not increase indefinitely. When not scaled properly, the marginal product of labor may go down when the number of employees goes up, creating a situation known as diminishing marginal returns. When the marginal product of labor becomes negative, it is known as negative marginal returns.

== Marginal costs ==
The marginal product of labor is directly related to costs of production. Costs are divided between fixed and variable costs. Fixed costs are costs that relate to the fixed input, capital, or rK, where r is the rental cost of capital and K is the quantity of capital. Variable costs (VC) are the costs of the variable input, labor, or wL, where w is the wage rate and L is the amount of labor employed. Thus, VC = wL. Marginal cost (MC) is the change in total cost per unit change in output or ∆C/∆Q. In the short run, production can be varied only by changing the variable input. Thus only variable costs change as output increases: ∆C = ∆VC = ∆(wL). Marginal cost is ∆(Lw)/∆Q. Now, ∆L/∆Q is the reciprocal of the marginal product of labor (∆Q/∆L). Therefore, marginal cost is simply the wage rate w divided by the marginal product of labor

$$\begin{align} MC & = \frac{\Delta VC}{\Delta Q} \\[6pt]
\Delta VC & = w\,\Delta L \\[6pt]
& \Delta L/\Delta Q \end{align}$$

(the change in quantity of labor to effect a one unit change in output) $= 1/MP_L.$

Therefore $MC = w/MP_L$

Thus, if the marginal product of labor is rising, then marginal costs will be falling, and if the marginal product of labor is falling, marginal costs will be rising (assuming a constant wage rate).

== Relation between MP_{L} and AP_{L} ==
The average product of labor (APL) is the total product of labor divided by the number of units of labor employed, or Q/L. The average product of labor is a common measure of labor productivity. The AP_{L} curve is shaped like an inverted “u”. At low production levels the AP_{L} tends to increase as additional labor is added. The primary reason for the increase is specialization and division of labor. At the point the AP_{L} reaches its maximum value AP_{L} equals the MP_{L}. Beyond this point the AP_{L} falls.

During the early stages of production MP_{L} is greater than AP_{L}. When the MP_{L} is above the AP_{L} the AP_{L} will increase. Eventually the MP_{L} reaches it maximum value at the point of diminishing returns. Beyond this point MP_{L} will decrease. However, at the point of diminishing returns the MP_{L} is still above the AP_{L} and AP_{L} will continue to increase until MP_{L} equals AP_{L}. When MP_{L} is below AP_{L}, AP_{L} will decrease.

Graphically, the AP_{L} curve can be derived from the total product curve by drawing secants from the origin that intersect (cut) the total product curve. The slope of the secant line equals the average product of labor, where the slope = dQ/dL. The slope of the curve at each intersection marks a point on the average product curve. The slope increases until the line reaches a point of tangency with the total product curve. This point marks the maximum average product of labor. It also marks the point where MP_{L} (which is the slope of the total product curve) equals the AP_{L} (the slope of the secant). Beyond this point the slope of the secants become progressively smaller as AP_{L} declines. The MP_{L} curve intersects the AP_{L} curve from above at the maximum point of the AP_{L} curve. Thereafter, the MP_{L} curve is below the AP_{L} curve.

== Diminishing marginal returns ==
The falling MP_{L} is due to the law of diminishing marginal returns. The law states, "as units of one input are added (with all other inputs held constant) a point will be reached where the resulting additions to output will begin to decrease; that is marginal product will decline." The law of diminishing marginal returns applies regardless of whether the production function exhibits increasing, decreasing, or constant returns to scale. The key factor is that the variable input is being changed while all other factors of production are being held constant. Under such circumstances diminishing marginal returns are inevitable at some level of production.

Diminishing marginal returns differs from diminishing returns. Diminishing marginal returns means that the marginal product of the variable input is falling. Diminishing returns occur when the marginal product of the variable input is negative. That is when a unit increase in the variable input causes total product to fall. At the point that diminishing returns begin the MP_{L} is zero.

== MP_{L}, MRP_{L} and profit maximization ==
The general rule is that a firm maximizes profit by producing that quantity of output where marginal revenue equals marginal costs. The profit maximization issue can also be approached from the input side. That is, what is the profit maximizing usage of the variable input? To maximize profits the firm should increase usage "up to the point where the input’s marginal revenue product equals its marginal costs". So, mathematically the profit maximizing rule is MRP_{L} = MC_{L}. The marginal profit per unit of labor equals the marginal revenue product of labor minus the marginal cost of labor or Mπ_{L} = MRP_{L} − MC_{L}A firm maximizes profits where Mπ_{L} = 0.

The marginal revenue product is the change in total revenue per unit change in the variable input assume labor. That is, MRP_{L} = ∆TR/∆L. MRP_{L} is the product of marginal revenue and the marginal product of labor or MRP_{L} = MR × MP_{L}.

- Derivation:

MR = ∆TR/∆Q
MP_{L} = ∆Q/∆L
MRP_{L} = MR × MP_{L} = (∆TR/∆Q) × (∆Q/∆L) = ∆TR/∆L

=== Example ===
- Assume that the production function is $Q = 90L - L^2$
- $MC_L = 30$
- Output price is $40 per unit.

$$MP_L = 90 - 2L$$
$$MRP_L = 40(90 - 2L)$$
$$MRP_L = 3600 - 80L$$
$MRP_L = MC_L$ (Profit Max Rule)
$$3600 - 80L = 30$$
$$3570 = 80L$$
$$L = 44.625$$
44.625 is the profit maximizing number of workers.
$$Q = 90L - L^2$$
$$Q = 90(44.625) - (44.625)^2$$
$$Q= 4016.25 - 1991.39$$
$$Q = 2024.86$$

- Thus, the profit maximizing output is 2024.86 units, units might be given in thousands. Therefore, quantity must not be discrete.
- And the profit is

$$\Pi = TR - TC$$
$TC = MC_L \cdot L$ (Actually marginal cost of labor is wages paid for each worker. Therefore we get total cost if we multiply it by the quantity of labor not by the quantity of products)
$$\Pi = 40(2024.86) - 30(44.625) = 80994.4 - 1338.75 = 79655.65$$

- Some might be confused by the fact that $L = 44.625$ as intuition would say that labor should be discrete. Remember, however, that labor is actually a time measure as well. Thus, it can be thought of as a worker not working the entire hour.

== Marginal productivity ethics ==
In the aftermath of the marginal revolution in economics, a number of economists including John Bates Clark and Thomas Nixon Carver sought to derive an ethical theory of income distribution based on the idea that workers were morally entitled to receive a wage exactly equal to their marginal product. In the 20th century, marginal productivity ethics found few supporters among economists, being criticised not only by egalitarians but by economists associated with the Chicago school such as Frank Knight (in The Ethics of Competition) and the Austrian School, such as Leland Yeager. However, marginal productivity ethics were defended by George Stigler.

A Review of Economics and Economic Methodology argues against pay to their marginal product to pay equal to the amount of their labor input. This is known as the labor theory of value. Marx characterizes the value of labor as a relationship between the person and things and how the perceived exchange of products is viewed socially. Alejandro Valle Baeza and Blanca Gloria Martínez González, Researchers compared productivity levels from countries that pay based on the marginal productivity and labor theory. The found that across countries, marginal productivity is more widely used than labor value, but when they measured productivity based on labor value, "productivity changes not only because of savings in both living labor and means of production, but it is also modified by changes in the productivity of these means of production."

== See also ==
- Marginal product of capital
