= Productivity model =

Method used to measure productivity

Productivity in economics is usually measured as the ratio of what is produced (an aggregate output) to what is used in producing it (an aggregate input). Productivity is closely related to the measure of production efficiency. A productivity model is a measurement method which is used in practice for measuring productivity. A productivity model must be able to compute Output / Input when there are many different outputs and inputs.

== Comparison of the productivity models ==
The principle of comparing productivity models is to identify the characteristics that are present in the models and to understand their differences. This task is alleviated by the fact that such characteristics can unmistakably be identified by their measurement formula. Bases on the model comparison, it is possible to identify the models that are suited for measuring productivity. A criterion of this solution is the production theory and the production function. It is essential that the model is able to describe the production function.

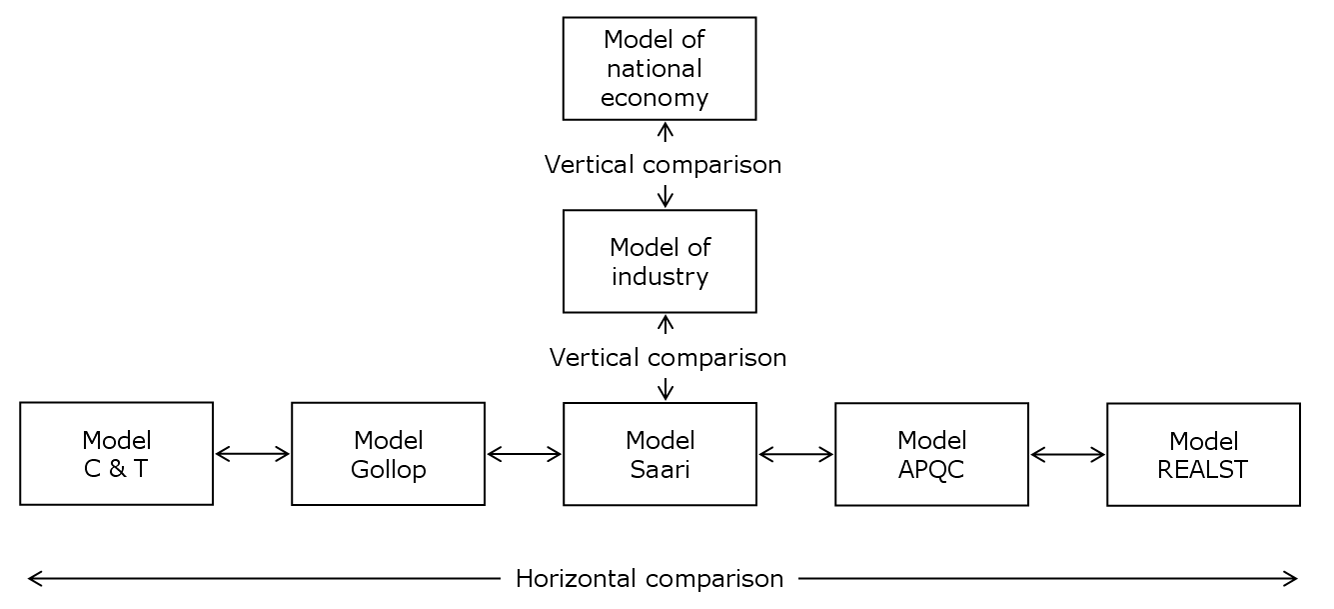
Dimensions of productivity model comparisons (Saari 2006b)

The principle of model comparison becomes evident in the figure. There are two dimensions in the comparison. Horizontal model comparison refers to a comparison between business models. Vertical model comparison refers to a comparison between economic levels of activity or between the levels of business, industry and national economy.

At all three levels of economy, that is, that of business, industry and national economy, a uniform understanding prevails of the phenomenon of productivity and of how it should be modelled and measured. The comparison reveals some differences that can mainly be seen to result from differences in measuring accuracy. It has been possible to develop the productivity model of business so as to be more accurate than that of national economy for the simple reason that in business the measuring data are much more accurate. (Saari 2006b)

== Business models ==
There are several different models available for measuring productivity. Comparing the models systematically has proved most problematic. In terms of pure mathematics it has not been possible to establish the different and similar characteristics of them so as to be able to understand each model as such and in relation to another model. This kind of comparison is possible using the productivity model which is a model with adjustable characteristics. An adjustable model can be set with the characteristics of the model under review after which both differences and similarities are identifiable.

A characteristic of the productivity measurement models that surpasses all the others is the ability to describe the production function. If the model can describe the production function, it is applicable to total productivity measurements. On the other hand, if it cannot describe the production function or if it can do so only partly, the model is not suitable for its task. The productivity models based on the production function form rather a coherent entity in which differences in models are fairly small. The differences play an insignificant role, and the solutions that are optional can be recommended for good reasons. Productivity measurement models can differ in characteristics from another in six ways.

1. First, it is necessary to examine and clarify the differences in the names of the concepts. Model developers have given different names to the same concepts, causing a lot of confusion. It goes without saying that differences in names do not affect the logic of modelling.
2. Model variables can differ; hence, the basic logic of the model is different. It is a question of which variables are used for the measurement. The most important characteristic of a model is its ability to describe the production function. This requirement is fulfilled in case the model has the production function variables of productivity and volume. Only the models that meet this criterion are worth a closer comparison. (Saari 2006b)
3. Calculation order of the variables can differ. Calculation is based on the principle of Ceteris paribus stating that when calculating the impacts of change in one variable all other variables are held constant. The order of calculating the variables has some effect on the calculation results, yet, the difference is not significant.
4. Theoretical framework of the model can be either cost theory or production theory. In a model based on the production theory, the volume of activity is measured by input volume. In a model based on the cost theory, the volume of activity is measured by output volume.
5. Accounting technique, i.e. how measurement results are produced, can differ. In calculation, three techniques apply: ratio accounting, variance accounting and accounting form. Differences in the accounting technique do not imply differences in accounting results but differences in clarity and intelligibility. Variance accounting gives the user most possibilities for an analysis.
6. Adjustability of the model. There are two kinds of models, fixed and adjustable. On an adjustable model, characteristics can be changed, and therefore, they can examine the characteristics of the other models. A fixed model can not be changed. It holds constant the characteristic that the developer has created in it.

Based on the variables used in the productivity model suggested for measuring business, such models can be grouped into three categories as follows:

- Productivity index models
- PPPV models
- PPPR models

In 1955, Davis published a book titled Productivity Accounting in which he presented a productivity index model. Based on Davis’ model several versions have been developed, yet, the basic solution is always the same (Kendrick & Creamer 1965, Craig & Harris 1973, Hines 1976, Mundel 1983, Sumanth 1979). The only variable in the index model is productivity, which implies that the model can not be used for describing the production function. Therefore, the model is not introduced in more detail here.

PPPV is the abbreviation for the following variables, profitability being expressed as a function of them:

Profitability = f (Productivity, Prices, Volume)

The model is linked to the profit and loss statement so that profitability is expressed as a function of productivity, volume and unit prices. Productivity and volume are the variables of a production function, and using them makes it is possible to describe the real process. A change in unit prices describes a change of production income distribution.

PPPR is the abbreviation for the following function:

Profitability = f (Productivity, Price Recovery)

In this model, the variables of profitability are productivity and price recovery. Only the productivity is a variable of the production function. The model lacks the variable of volume, and for this reason, the model can not describe the production function. The American models of REALST (Loggerenberg & Cucchiaro 1982, Pineda 1990) and APQC (Kendrick 1984, Brayton 1983, Genesca & Grifell, 1992, Pineda 1990) belong to this category of models but since they do not apply to describing the production function (Saari 2000) they are not reviewed here more closely.

== Comparative summary of the models ==
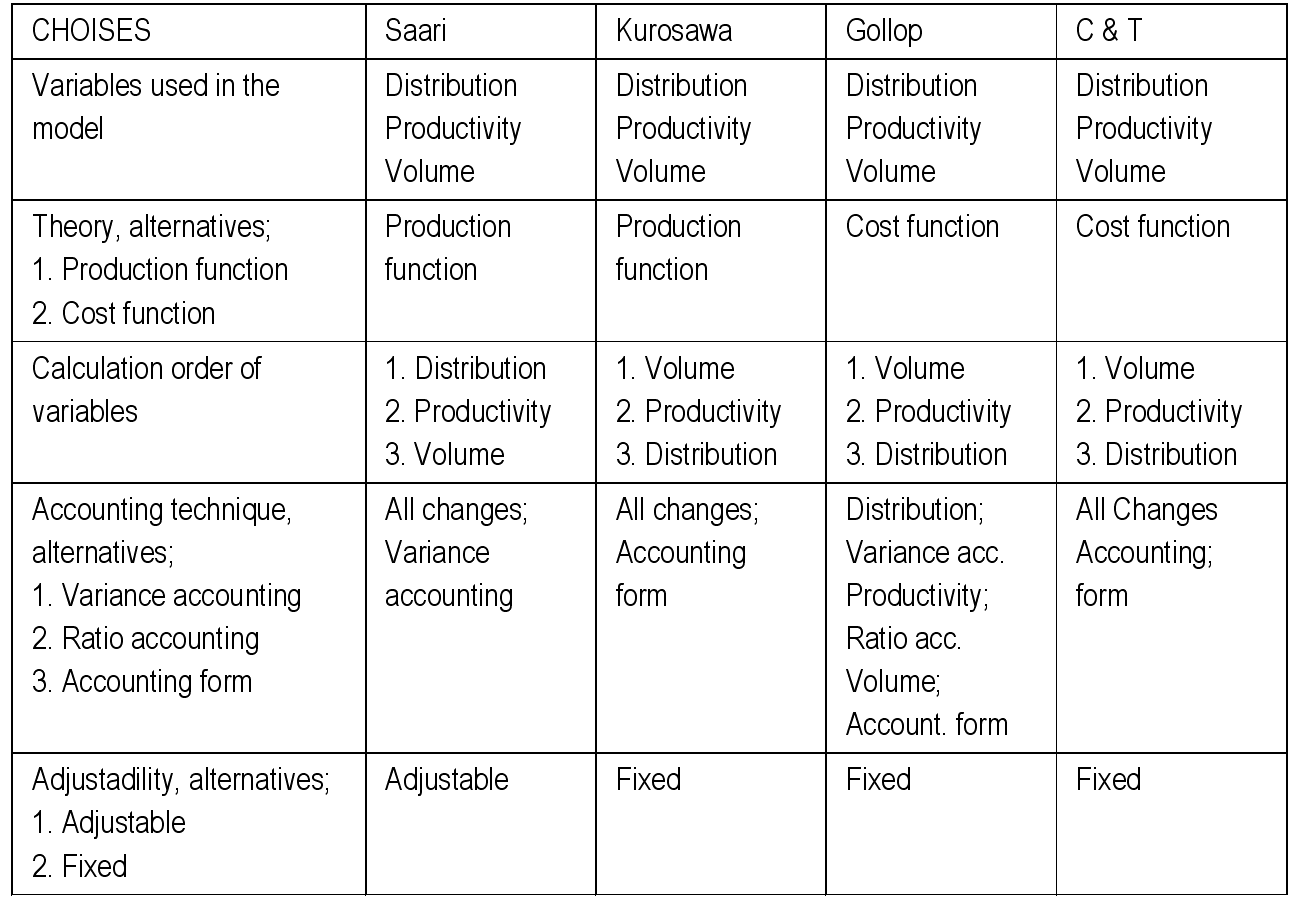
Summary of productivity models (Saari 2006b)

PPPV models measure profitability as a function of productivity, volume and income distribution (unit prices). Such models are

- Japanese Kurosawa (1975)
- French Courbois & Temple (1975)
- Finnish Saari (1976, 2000, 2004, 2006a, 2006b)
- American Gollop (1979)

The table presents the characteristics of the PPPV models. All four models use the same variables by which a change in profitability is written into formulas to be used for measurement. These variables are income distribution (prices), productivity and volume. A conclusion is that the basic logic of measurement is the same in all models. The method of implementing the measurements varies to a degree, depending on the fact that the models do not produce similar results from the same calculating material.

Even if the production function variables of profitability and volume were in the model, in practice the calculation can also be carried out in compliance with the cost function. This is the case in models C & T as well as Gollop. Calculating methods differ in the use of either output volume or input volume for measuring the volume of activity. The former solution complies with the cost function and the latter with the production function. It is obvious that the calculation produces different results from the same material. A recommendation is to apply calculation in accordance with the production function. According to the definition of the production function used in the productivity models Saari and Kurosawa, productivity means the quantity and quality of output per one unit of input.

Models differ from one another significantly in their calculation techniques. Differences in calculation technique do not cause differences in calculation results but it is rather a question of differences in clarity and intelligibility between the models. From the comparison it is evident that the models of Courbois & Temple and Kurosawa are purely based on calculation formulas. The calculation is based on the aggregates in the loss and profit account. Consequently, it does not suit to analysis. The productivity model Saari is purely based on variance accounting known from the standard cost accounting. The variance accounting is applied to elementary variables, that is, to quantities and prices of different products and inputs. Variance accounting gives the user most possibilities for analysis. The model of Gollop is a mixed model by its calculation technique. Every variable is calculated using a different calculation technique. (Saari 2006b)

The productivity model Saari is the only model with alterable characteristics. Hence, it is an adjustable model. A comparison between other models has been feasible by exploiting this particular characteristic of this model.

== Models of national economy ==
In order to measure productivity of a nation or an industry, it is necessary to operationalize the same concept of productivity as in business, yet, the object of modelling is substantially wider and the information more aggregate. The calculations of total productivity of a nation or an industry are based on the time series of the SNA, System of National Accounts, formulated and developed for half a century. National accounting is a system based on the recommendations of the UN (SNA 93) to measure total production and total income of a nation and how they are used.

Measurement of productivity is at its most accurate in business because of the availability of all elementary data of the quantities and prices of the inputs and the output in production. The more comprehensive the entity we want to analyse by measurements, the more data need to be aggregated. In productivity measurement, combining and aggregating the data always involves reduced measurement accuracy.

=== Output measurement ===
Conceptually speaking, the amount of total production means the same in the national economy and in business but for practical reasons modelling the concept differs, respectively. In national economy, the total production is measured as the sum of value added whereas in business it is measured by the total output value. When the output is calculated by the value added, all purchase inputs (energy, materials etc.) and their productivity impacts are excluded from the examination. Consequently, the production function of national economy is written as follows:

Value Added = Output = f (Capital, Labour)

In business, production is measured by the gross value of production, and in addition to the producer's own inputs (capital and labour) productivity analysis comprises all purchase inputs such as raw-materials, energy, outsourcing services, supplies, components, etc. Accordingly, it is possible to measure the total productivity in business which implies absolute consideration of all inputs. It is clear that productivity measurement in business gives a more accurate result because it analyses all the inputs used in production. (Saari 2006b)

The productivity measurement based on national accounting has been under development recently. The method is known as KLEMS, and it takes all production inputs into consideration. KLEMS is an abbreviation for K = capital, L = labour, E = energy, M = materials, and S = services. In principle, all inputs are treated the same way. As for the capital input in particular this means that it is measured by capital services, not by the capital stock.

=== Combination or aggregation problem ===
The problem of aggregating or combining the output and inputs is purely measurement technical, and it is caused by the fixed grouping of the items. In national accounting, data need to be fed under fixed items resulting in large items of output and input which are not homogeneous as provided in the measurements but include qualitative changes. There is no fixed grouping of items in the business production model, neither for inputs nor for products, but both inputs and products are present in calculations by their own names representing the elementary price and quantity of the calculation material. (Saari 2006b)

=== Problem of the relative prices ===
For productivity analyses, the value of total production of the national economy, GNP, is calculated with fixed prices. The fixed price calculation principle means that the prices by which quantities are evaluated are held fixed or unchanged for a given period. In the calculation complying with national accounting, a fixed price GNP is obtained by applying the so-called basic year prices. Since the basic year is usually changed every 5th year, the evaluation of the output and input quantities remains unchanged for five years. When the new basic-year prices are introduced, relative prices will change in relation to the prices of the previous basic year, which has its certain impact on productivity

Old basic-year prices entail inaccuracy in the production measurement. For reasons of market economy, relative values of output and inputs alter while the relative prices of the basic year do not react to these changes in any way. Structural changes like this will be wrongly evaluated. Short life-cycle products will not have any basis of evaluation because they are born and they die in between the two basic years. Obtaining good productivity by elasticity is ignored if old and long-term fixed prices are being used. In business models this problem does not exist, because the correct prices are available all the time. (Saari 2006b)

== See also ==
- Production (economics)
- Production theory
- Production function
- Productivity
