= Illiers-l'Évêque =

- Commune
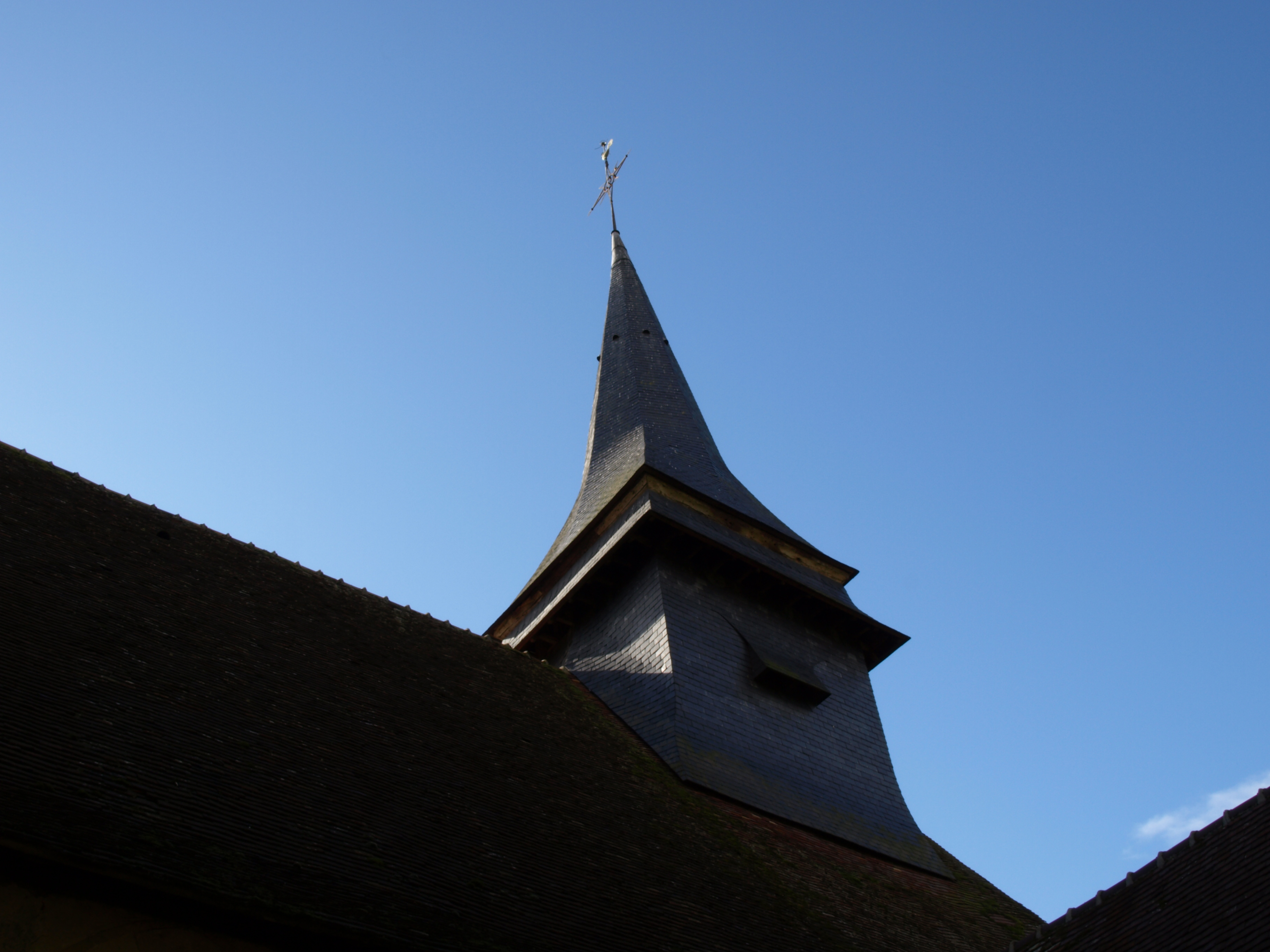
- The Notre-Dame-de-Pitié chapel in Illiers-l'Évêque

- Coat of arms
- Location of Illiers-l'Évêque
- Location within France Location within Normandy
- Coordinates: 48°49′18″N 1°16′03″E
- Country: France
- Region: Normandy
- Department: Eure
- Arrondissement: Évreux
- Canton: Verneuil d'Avre et d'Iton
- Intercommunality: Évreux Portes de Normandie

Government
  - Mayor (2020–2026): Joël Clomenil
- Area^{1}: 20.63 km^{2} (7.97 sq mi)
- Elevation: 133 m (436 ft)
- Highest elevation: 147 m (482 ft)
- Lowest elevation: 114 m (374 ft)
- Population (2023): 1,014
  - Density: 49.15/km^{2} (127.3/sq mi)
- Time zone: UTC+01:00 (CET)
  - Summer (DST): UTC+02:00 (CEST)
- INSEE/Postal code: 27350 /27770
- ^{1} French Land Register data, which excludes lakes, ponds, glaciers > 1 km^{2} (0.386 sq mi or 247 acres) and river estuaries.

Illiers-l'Évêque (French pronunciation: [ilje levɛk]) is a commune in the Eure department in northern France.

== Population ==
Historical population
Year	Pop.	±% p.a.
1968	569	—
1975	595	+0.64%
1982	613	+0.43%
1990	734	+2.28%
1999	890	+2.16%
2007	981	+1.22%
2012	997	+0.32%
2017	999	+0.04%
2023	1,014	+0.25%
Source: INSEE

== See also ==
- Communes of the Eure department
