= Marginal demand =

Marginal demand in economics is the change in demand for a product or service in response to a specific change in its price. Normally, as prices for goods or services rise, demand falls, and conversely, as prices for goods or services fall, demand rises. A product or service for which price changes cause a relatively big change in demand is said to have elastic demand. A product or service where price changes cause a relatively small change in demand is said to have inelastic demand.

== See also ==
- Price elasticity of demand
- Supply and demand
