= The Girl on a Motorcycle =

1968 film by Jack Cardiff

- French theatrical release poster
- Directed by: Jack Cardiff
- Screenplay by: Ronald Duncan; Jack Cardiff
- Based on: La Motocyclette by André Pieyre de Mandiargues
- Produced by: William Sassoon
- Starring: Alain Delon; Marianne Faithfull; Roger Mutton; Marius Goring
- Cinematography: Jack Cardiff
- Edited by: Peter Musgrave
- Music by: Les Reed
- Production companies: Ares Productions; Mid Atlantic Film (Holdings)
- Distributed by: British Lion Films (United Kingdom); Société Nouvelle de Cinématographie (France)
- Release dates: 21 June 1968 (France); 13 October 1968 (United Kingdom)
- Running time: 91 minutes
- Countries: United Kingdom; France
- Language: English
- Box office: 626,331 admissions (France)

The Girl on a Motorcycle (French: La Motocyclette) is a 1968 erotic romantic drama film directed by Jack Cardiff, starring Alain Delon and Marianne Faithfull. It is based on the 1963 novel La Motocyclette by André Pieyre de Mandiargues. Released as Naked Under Leather, it was the first film to receive an X rating in the United States, and edited by Warner Brothers for an "R" rating. It was listed to compete at the 1968 Cannes Film Festival, but the festival was cancelled due to the May 1968 events in France.

The Girl on a Motorcycle redefined the leather jacket for motorcyclists into a catsuit, created by John Sutcliffe, that Faithfull wore in the film.

== Plot ==
The film is set in France and Germany. Newly married Rebecca Nul leaves her husband Raymond's bed on her prized motorbike—her symbol of freedom and escape. During her ride to visit Daniel Lionart, her lover in Heidelberg, she indulges in psychedelic and erotic reveries as she relives her changing relationship with the two men.

Flashbacks reveal that Rebecca met Daniel while working at her father's bookshop a few weeks before her marriage to Raymond, a school teacher. Daniel gives Rebecca motorcycle driving lessons on a Norton Atlas motorcycle. They quickly become lovers. She asks him if he will marry her, and he simply says "No". She tells him that she is soon to be married, and he says he will give her a wedding present. A Harley Davidson Electra Glide motorcycle is delivered to Rebecca at the bookshop. Her father says she should refuse it, but she asks Raymond what she should do and he says she should do what will make her happy.

Rebecca rides the motorcycle from France to Germany to be with Daniel. After having several drinks of kirsch in a small village bar, she drives fast and recklessly, and although she wears leathers she has no helmet, and her ride to Daniel ends prematurely when she collides with a truck which swerves in front of her, throwing her head-first through the windscreen of an oncoming car, which then crashes into the truck.

== Cast ==
- Alain Delon as Daniel Lionart
- Marianne Faithfull as Rebecca Nul
- Roger Mutton as Raymond Nul
- Marius Goring as Rebecca's Father
- Catherine Jourdan as Catherine
- Jean Leduc as Jean
- Jacques Marin as Pump Attendant
- André Maranne as French Superintendent
- Bari Jonson as French Customs Officer #1
- Arnold Diamond as French Customs Officer #2
- John G. Heller as German Customs Officer
- Marika Rivera as German Waitress
- Richard Blake as Student #1
- Chris Williams as Student #2
- Colin West as Student #3

== Production ==
The film was made on locations in France (including Haguenau), Germany (including Neulauterburg), Switzerland (including Geneva), and Belgium. The bookshop scenes were filmed at the A. Jullien bookshop in Bourg-de-Four Geneva. In many of the scenes where Marianne Faithfull is seen driving the Harley Davidson Electra Glide motorcycle at high speeds, she was seated on the motorcycle which was attached to a platform that was being pulled by a vehicle in front of it. Many of the scenes were filmed in the English language and then again in the French language.

Jack Cardiff received extensive cooperation from the police in blocking the roads, so many scenes show only the lone motorcycle and no other vehicular traffic. The final crash scene was staged on an abandoned airstrip in England. The psychedelic colour effects were achieved by solarizing the film during post-production. Faithfull's riding double in medium to distant shots was Bill Ivy, British Grand Prix motorcycle champion.

== Reception ==
=== Box office ===
The Girl on a Motorcycle was the sixth most popular film in general release in Britain during 1968.

=== Critical response ===
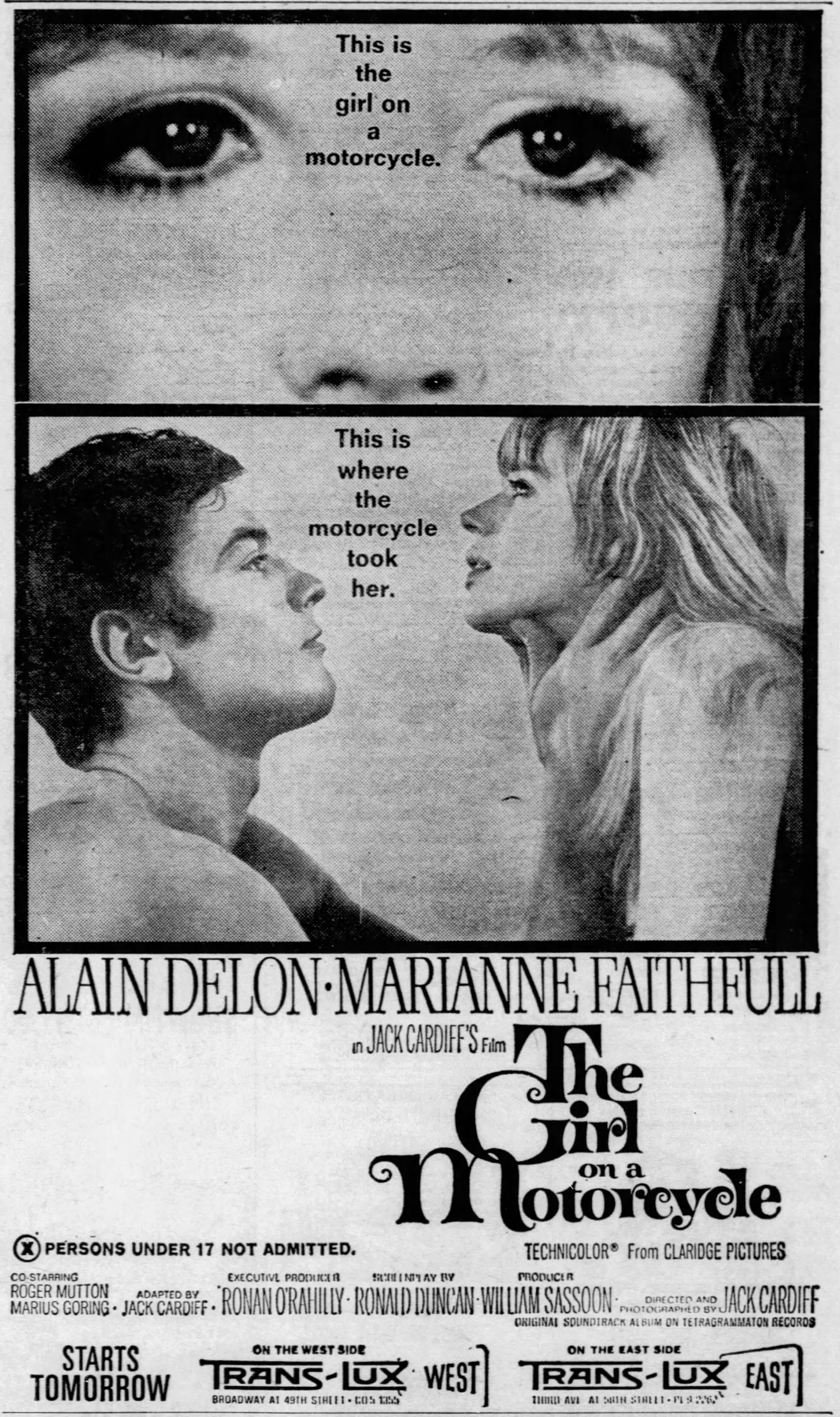
U.S. theatrical advertisement from 1968

The Monthly Film Bulletin wrote: "What with Alain Delon morosely pawing the zip on Marianne Faithfull's leather suit and muttering 'Your body is like a violin in a velvet case' while she squeaks 'Skin me!' with ecstatic urgency, Girl on a Motorcycle will probably thrill countless maidenly devotees of women's magazine pornography. All the imagery is there, from the darkly passionate stranger (zoom in to hypnotic eyes now and again) to the sadistic ringmaster of fantasy who strips the clothes off his beloved with a cracking whip; and Jack Cardiff pulls out all the lush stops with endless shots of mistily-filtered landscapes, tricksy colour fantasies, and nudging shots of the heroine's bust and buttocks (clad or unclad). The dialogue, which consists largely of anthropomorphic apostrophes to the motorcycle ('My Black Devil makes love beautifully. . . . Take me to him!'), has to be heard to be believed."

The Radio Times Guide to Films gave the film three out of five stars, writing: "This quintessential 1960s movie catches Marianne Faithfull on the cusp between beauty and seedy decline. She is required to do little more than sneer, pout and wrap her leather-encased limbs around said bike, but this image alone reduced a generation of males to pop-eyed slavering wrecks. The plot is as wafer thin but, with its gallery of cinematic icons of the day, the movie is still a delicious-looking curiosity."

On the review aggregator website Rotten Tomatoes, 38% of 8 critics' reviews are positive.

== Home media releases ==
The Girl on a Motorcycle was released on VHS in 1998 and DVD in 1999 by Starz/Anchor Bay. A remastered edition on DVD and Blu-ray was released in 2012 by Jezebel. Both versions contain the same film material, commentary by director Jack Cardiff, and original theatrical trailer. However, the earlier version is approximately 91 minutes long, while the later, remastered version, is approximately 88 minutes long. This time discrepancy is due to the earlier version playing at a slightly slower speed. A 4K restoration was released on Blu-ray on 13 December 2022 by Kino Lorber.
