= Marginal use =

Concept in the Austrian School of economics

As defined by the Austrian School of economics the marginal use of a good or service is the specific use to which an agent would put a given increase, or the specific use of the good or service that would be abandoned in response to a given decrease. The usefulness of the marginal use thus corresponds to the marginal utility of the good or service.

On the assumption that an agent is economically rational, each increase would be put to the specific, feasible, previously unrealized use of greatest priority, and each decrease would result in abandonment of the use of lowest priority amongst the uses to which the good or service had been put. And, in the absence of a complementarity across uses, the “law” of diminishing marginal utility will obtain.

The Austrian School of economics explicitly arrives at its conception of marginal utility as the utility of the marginal use, and “Grenznutzen” (the Austrian School term from which “marginal utility” was originally derived in translation) literally means border-use; other schools usually do not make an explicit connection.

== See also ==
- Marginalism
