= Marginal product =

Change in output resulting from employing one more unit of a particular input

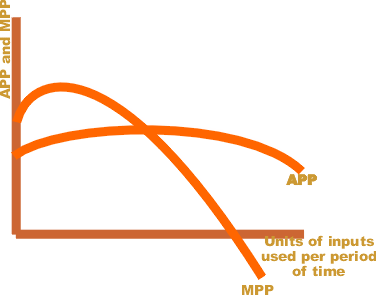
Average physical product (APP), marginal physical product (MPP)

In economics and in particular neoclassical economics, the marginal product or marginal physical productivity of an input (factor of production) is the change in output resulting from employing one more unit of a particular input (for instance, the change in output when a firm's labor is increased from five to six units), assuming that the quantities of other inputs are kept constant.

The marginal product of a given input can be expressed as:

$$MP =  \frac{\Delta Y}{\Delta X}$$

where $\Delta X$ is the change in the firm's use of the input (conventionally a one-unit change) and $\Delta Y$ is the change in the quantity of output produced (resulting from the change in the input). Note that the quantity $Y$ of the "product" is typically defined ignoring external costs and benefits.

If the output and the input are infinitely divisible, so the marginal "units" are infinitesimal, the marginal product is the mathematical derivative of the production function with respect to that input. Suppose a firm's output Y is given by the production function:

$$Y=F(K,L)$$

where K and L are inputs to production (say, capital and labor, respectively). Then the marginal product of capital (MPK) and marginal product of labor (MPL) are given by:

$$MPK=\frac{\partial F}{\partial K}$$

$$MPL=\frac{\partial F}{\partial L}$$

In the law of diminishing marginal returns, the marginal product initially increases when more of an input (say labor) is employed, keeping the other input (say capital) constant. Here, labor is the variable input and capital is the fixed input (in a hypothetical two-inputs model). As more and more of variable input (labor) is employed, marginal product starts to fall. Finally, after a certain point, the marginal product becomes negative, implying that the additional unit of labor has decreased the output, rather than increasing it. The reason behind this is the diminishing marginal productivity of labor.

The marginal product of labor is the slope of the total product curve, which is the production function plotted against labor usage for a fixed level of usage of the capital input.

In the neoclassical theory of competitive markets, the marginal product of labor equals the real wage. In aggregate models of perfect competition, in which a single good is produced and that good is used both in consumption and as a capital good, the marginal product of capital equals its rate of return. As was shown in the Cambridge capital controversy, this proposition about the marginal product of capital cannot generally be sustained in multi-commodity models in which capital and consumption goods are distinguished.

== Relationship of marginal product (MPP) with the total product (TPP) ==
The relationship can be explained in three phases- (1) Initially, as the quantity of variable input is increased, TPP rises at an increasing rate. In this phase, MPP also rises. (2) As more and more quantities of the variable inputs are employed, TPP increases at a diminishing rate. In this phase, MPP starts to fall. (3) When the TPP reaches its maximum, MPP is zero. Beyond this point, TPP starts to fall and MPP becomes negative.

== See also ==
- Marginal product of labor
- Marginal product of capital
- Marginal revenue productivity theory of wages
- Marginal cost
- Production theory
- Average product
- Cost of production
- Shadow price
