= The Margin (novel) =

1967 novel by André Pieyre de Mandiargues

- Author: André Pieyre de Mandiargues
- Original title: La Marge
- Translator: R. Howard
- Genre: Novel
- Publisher: Gallimard
- Publication date: 1967
- Publication place: France
- English publication date: 1970
- Pages: 248

The Margin (French: La Marge) is a novel by André Pieyre de Mandiargues published in 1967, which won the Prix Goncourt the same year. It was first published in the UK as The Margin in 1970, translated by R. Howard.

== Plot ==
Sigismond Pons, a settled married man with a son, takes a business trip to Barcelona to fill in for his wine-seller cousin, who fell ill. Sigismond's secret plan is to use this opportunity to escape stereotype and fulfill some erotic fantasies. Before leaving, Sigismond had made a deal with his wife Sergina, that she would send him a letter to Barcelona post office, which he would collect after his arrival. Upon arrival and check-in into hotel Tibidabo recommended by his cousin, he walks through the city, picks up the letter but finds out it was not written by his wife, but by his son's nurse Felina. Expecting bad news, he dares to read only the last sentence of the letter which mentions someone being dead. Sigismond decides to delay reading the rest of the letter, since he wants to enjoy living free for a bit longer, fearing return to the tragic reality. He leaves the letter in his hotel room pressed under a glass bottle in the shape of Columbus Monument and spends next few days exploring the life of the city. During one of his night trips he also meets a young prostitute Juanita, with whom he spends three subsequent nights. Eventually however, Sigismond is more and more frequently haunted by phantoms of his wife and his father, which leads him to finally open and read the letter, learning that his son drowned by accident leading to his wife's suicide. After finally learning the truth, Sigismond leaves the city by car at night and shoots himself in a stone quarry.

== Film adaptation ==
The novel was adapted into a film in 1976 directed by Walerian Borowczyk as La Marge, internationally as The Margin and in the UK as The Streetwalker.

== Editions ==
- La Marge, Éditions Gallimard, Paris, 1967.
- The Margin, J Calder (January 29, 1970). ISBN 0-7145-0363-0

Preceded by Oublier Palerme - Edmonde Charles-Roux	Prix Goncourt; 1967	Succeeded by Les Fruits de l'hiver - Bernard Clavel
