= Production (economics) =

Process of using materials to produce something

Production is the process of combining various inputs, both material (such as metal, wood, glass, or plastics) and immaterial (such as plans, or knowledge) in order to create output. Ideally, this output will be a good or service which has value and contributes to the utility of individuals. The area of economics that focuses on production is called production theory, and it is closely related to the consumption (or consumer) theory of economics.

The production process and output directly result from productively utilising the original inputs (or factors of production). Known as land, labor, capital and entrepreneurship, these are deemed the four fundamental factors of production. These primary inputs are not significantly altered in the output process, nor do they become a whole component in the product. Under classical economics, materials and energy are categorised as secondary factors as they are byproducts of land, labour and capital. Delving further, primary factors encompass all of the resourcing involved, such as land, which includes the natural resources above and below the soil. However, there is a difference between human capital and labour. In addition to the common factors of production, in different economic schools of thought, entrepreneurship and technology are sometimes considered evolved factors in production. It is common practice that several forms of controllable inputs are used to achieve the output of a product. The production function assesses the relationship between the inputs and the quantity of output.

Economic welfare is created in a production process, meaning all economic activities that aim directly or indirectly to satisfy human wants and needs. The degree to which the needs are satisfied is often accepted as a measure of economic welfare. In production, there are two features that explain increasing economic welfare. The first is improving quality-price-ratio of goods and services and increasing incomes from growing and more efficient market production, and the second is total production which help in increasing GDP. The most important forms of production include market production, public production and household production.

In order to understand the origin of economic well-being, we must understand these three production processes. All of them produce commodities which have value and contribute to the well-being of individuals. The satisfaction of needs originates from the use of the commodities which are produced. The need satisfaction increases when the quality-price-ratio of the commodities improves and more satisfaction is achieved at less cost. Improving the quality-price-ratio of commodities is to a producer an essential way to improve the competitiveness of products but this kind of gains distributed to customers cannot be measured with production data. Improving product competitiveness often means lower prices and to the producer lower producer income, to be compensated with higher sales volume.

Economic well-being also increases due to income gains from increasing production. Market production is the only production form that creates and distributes incomes to stakeholders. Public production and household production are financed by the incomes generated in market production. Thus market production has a double role: creating well-being and producing goods and services and income creation. Because of this double role, market production is the "primus motor" of economic well-being.

== Elements of production economics ==
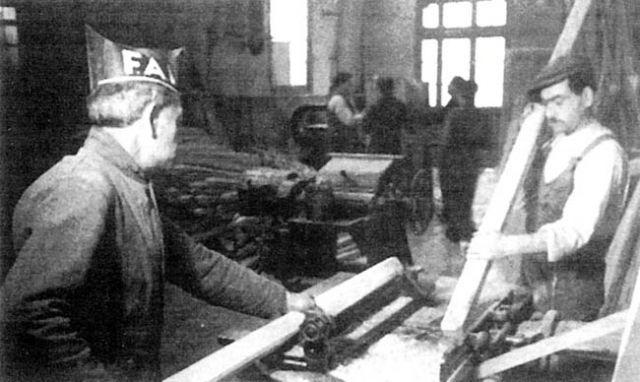
CNT-FAI worker cooperative in Barcelona producing wood and steel products

The underlying assumption of production is that maximisation of profit is the key objective of the producer. The difference in the value of the production values (the output value) and costs (associated with the factors of production) is the calculated profit. Efficiency, technological, pricing, behavioural, consumption and productivity changes are a few of the critical elements that significantly influence production economically.

=== Efficiency ===
Within production, efficiency plays a tremendous role in achieving and maintaining full capacity, rather than producing an inefficient (not optimal) level. Changes in efficiency relate to the positive shift in current inputs, such as technological advancements, relative to the producer's position. Efficiency is calculated by the actual output divided by the maximum potential output. An example of the efficiency calculation is that if the applied inputs have the potential to produce 100 units but are producing 60 units, the efficiency of the output is 0.6, or 60%. Furthermore, economies of scale identify the point at which production efficiency (returns) can be increased, decrease or remain constant.

=== Technological changes ===
This element sees the ongoing adaption of technology at the frontier of the production function. Technological change is a significant determinant in advancing economic production results, as noted throughout economic histories, such as the industrial revolution. Therefore, it is critical to continue to monitor its effects on production and promote the development of new technologies.

=== Behaviour, consumption and productivity ===
There is a strong correlation between the producer's behaviour and the underlying assumption of production – both assume profit maximising behaviour. Production can be either increased, decreased or remain constant as a result of consumption, amongst various other factors. The relationship between production and consumption is mirror against the economic theory of supply and demand. Accordingly, when production decreases more than factor consumption, this results in reduced productivity. Contrarily, a production increase over consumption is seen as increased productivity.

=== Pricing ===
In an economic market, production input and output prices are assumed to be set from external factors as the producer is the price taker. Hence, pricing is an important element in the real-world application of production economics. Should the pricing be too high, the production of the product is simply unviable. There is also a strong link between pricing and consumption, with this influencing the overall production scale.

== As a source of economic well-being ==
In principle there are two main activities in an economy, production and consumption. Similarly, there are two kinds of actors, producers and consumers. Well-being is made possible by efficient production and by the interaction between producers and consumers. In the interaction, consumers can be identified in two roles both of which generate well-being. Consumers can be both customers of the producers and suppliers to the producers. The customers' well-being arises from the commodities they are buying and the suppliers' well-being is related to the income they receive as compensation for the production inputs they have delivered to the producers.

=== Stakeholders of production ===
Stakeholders of production are persons, groups or organizations with an interest in a producing company. Economic well-being originates in efficient production and it is distributed through the interaction between the company's stakeholders. The stakeholders of companies are economic actors which have an economic interest in a company. Based on the similarities of their interests, stakeholders can be classified into three groups in order to differentiate their interests and mutual relations. The three groups are as follows:

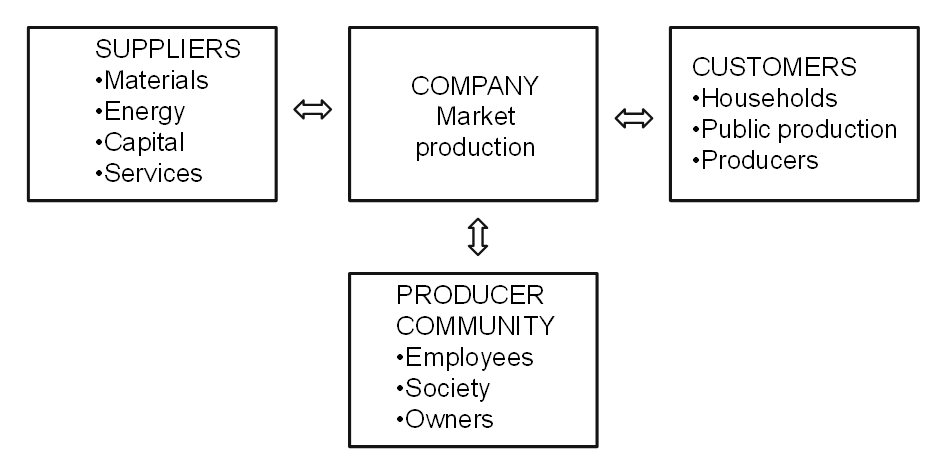
Interactive contributions of a company's stakeholders (Saari, 2011, 4)

Customers

The customers of a company are typically consumers, other market producers or producers in the public sector. Each of them has their individual production functions. Due to competition, the price-quality-ratios of commodities tend to improve and this brings the benefits of better productivity to customers. Customers get more for less. In households and the public sector this means that more need satisfaction is achieved at less cost. For this reason, the productivity of customers can increase over time even though their incomes remain unchanged.

Suppliers

The suppliers of companies are typically producers of materials, energy, capital, and services. They all have their individual production functions. The changes in prices or qualities of supplied commodities have an effect on both actors' (company and suppliers) production functions. We come to the conclusion that the production functions of the company and its suppliers are in a state of continuous change.

Producers

Those participating in production, i.e., the labour force, society and owners, are collectively referred to as the producer community or producers. The producer community generates income from developing and growing production.

The well-being gained through commodities stems from the price-quality relations of the commodities. Due to competition and development in the market, the price-quality relations of commodities tend to improve over time. Typically the quality of a commodity goes up and the price goes down over time. This development favourably affects the production functions of customers. Customers get more for less. Consumer customers get more satisfaction at less cost. This type of well-being generation can only partially be calculated from the production data. The situation is presented in this study. The producer community (labour force, society, and owners) earns income as compensation for the inputs they have delivered to the production. When the production grows and becomes more efficient, the income tends to increase. In production this brings about an increased ability to pay salaries, taxes and profits. The growth of production and improved productivity generate additional income for the producing community. Similarly, the high income level achieved in the community is a result of the high volume of production and its good performance. This type of well-being generation – as mentioned earlier - can be reliably calculated from the production data.

=== Main processes of a producing company ===
A producing company can be divided into sub-processes in different ways; yet, the following five are identified as main processes, each with a logic, objectives, theory and key figures of its own. It is important to examine each of them individually, yet, as a part of the whole, in order to be able to measure and understand them. The main processes of a company are as follows:

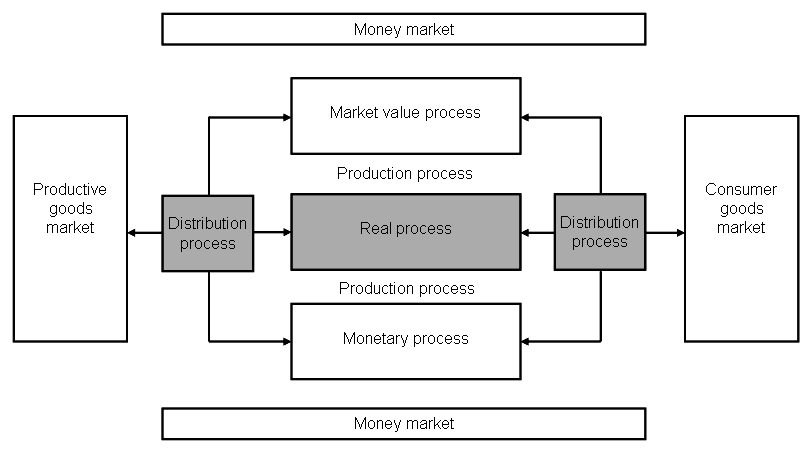
Main processes of a producing company (Saari 2006, 3)

- real process.
- income distribution process
- production process.
- monetary process.
- market value process.

Production output is created in the real process, gains of production are distributed in the income distribution process and these two processes constitute the production process. The production process and its sub-processes, the real process and income distribution process occur simultaneously, and only the production process is identifiable and measurable by the traditional accounting practices. The real process and income distribution process can be identified and measured by extra calculation, and this is why they need to be analyzed separately in order to understand the logic of production and its performance.

Real process generates the production output from input, and it can be described by means of the production function. It refers to a series of events in production in which production inputs of different quality and quantity are combined into products of different quality and quantity. Products can be physical goods, immaterial services and most often combinations of both. The characteristics created into the product by the producer imply surplus value to the consumer, and on the basis of the market price this value is shared by the consumer and the producer in the marketplace. This is the mechanism through which surplus value originates to the consumer and the producer likewise. Surplus values to customers cannot be measured from any production data. Instead the surplus value to a producer can be measured. It can be expressed both in terms of nominal and real values. The real surplus value to the producer is an outcome of the real process, real income, and measured proportionally it means productivity.

The concept "real process" in the meaning quantitative structure of production process was introduced in Finnish management accounting in the 1960s. Since then it has been a cornerstone in the Finnish management accounting theory. (Riistama et al. 1971)

Income distribution process of the production refers to a series of events in which the unit prices of constant-quality products and inputs alter causing a change in income distribution among those participating in the exchange. The magnitude of the change in income distribution is directly proportionate to the change in prices of the output and inputs and to their quantities. Productivity gains are distributed, for example, to customers as lower product sales prices or to staff as higher income pay.

The production process consists of the real process and the income distribution process. A result and a criterion of success of the owner is profitability. The profitability of production is the share of the real process result the owner has been able to keep to himself in the income distribution process. Factors describing the production process are the components of profitability, i.e., returns and costs. They differ from the factors of the real process in that the components of profitability are given at nominal prices whereas in the real process the factors are at periodically fixed prices.

Monetary process refers to events related to financing the business. Market value process refers to a series of events in which investors determine the market value of the company in the investment markets.

=== Production growth and performance ===
Economic growth may be defined as a production increase of an output of a production process. It is usually expressed as a growth percentage depicting growth of the real production output. The real output is the real value of products produced in a production process and when we subtract the real input from the real output we get the real income. The real output and the real income are generated by the real process of production from the real inputs.

The real process can be described by means of the production function. The production function is a graphical or mathematical expression showing the relationship between the inputs used in production and the output achieved. Both graphical and mathematical expressions are presented and demonstrated. The production function is a simple description of the mechanism of income generation in production process. It consists of two components. These components are a change in production input and a change in productivity.

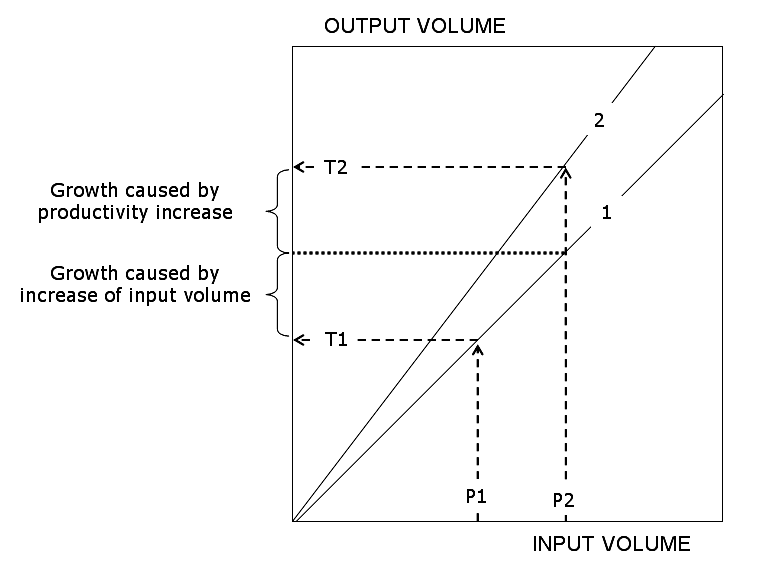
Components of economic growth (Saari 2006,2)

The figure illustrates an income generation process (exaggerated for clarity). The Value T2 (value at time 2) represents the growth in output from Value T1 (value at time 1). Each time of measurement has its own graph of the production function for that time (the straight lines). The output measured at time 2 is greater than the output measured at time one for both of the components of growth: an increase of inputs and an increase of productivity. The portion of growth caused by the increase in inputs is shown on line 1 and does not change the relation between inputs and outputs. The portion of growth caused by an increase in productivity is shown on line 2 with a steeper slope. So increased productivity represents greater output per unit of input.

The growth of production output does not reveal anything about the performance of the production process. The performance of production measures production's ability to generate income. Because the income from production is generated in the real process, we call it the real income. Similarly, as the production function is an expression of the real process, we could also call it "income generated by the production function".

The real income generation follows the logic of the production function. Two components can also be distinguished in the income change: the income growth caused by an increase in production input (production volume) and the income growth caused by an increase in productivity. The income growth caused by increased production volume is determined by moving along the production function graph. The income growth corresponding to a shift of the production function is generated by the increase in productivity. The change of real income so signifies a move from the point 1 to the point 2 on the production function (above). When we want to maximize the production performance we have to maximize the income generated by the production function.

The sources of productivity growth and production volume growth are explained as follows. Productivity growth is seen as the key economic indicator of innovation. The successful introduction of new products and new or altered processes, organization structures, systems, and business models generates growth of output that exceeds the growth of inputs. This results in growth in productivity or output per unit of input. Income growth can also take place without innovation through replication of established technologies. With only replication and without innovation, output will increase in proportion to inputs. (Jorgenson et al. 2014, 2) This is the case of income growth through production volume growth.

Jorgenson et al. (2014, 2) give an empiric example. They show that the great preponderance of economic growth in the US since 1947 involves the replication of existing technologies through investment in equipment, structures, and software and expansion of the labor force. Further, they show that innovation accounts for only about twenty percent of US economic growth.

In the case of a single production process (described above) the output is defined as an economic value of products and services produced in the process. When we want to examine an entity of many production processes we have to sum up the value-added created in the single processes. This is done in order to avoid the double accounting of intermediate inputs. Value-added is obtained by subtracting the intermediate inputs from the outputs. The most well-known and used measure of value-added is the GDP (Gross Domestic Product). It is widely used as a measure of the economic growth of nations and industries.

=== Absolute (total) and average income ===
The production performance can be measured as an average or an absolute income. Expressing performance both in average (avg.) and absolute (abs.) quantities is helpful for understanding the welfare effects of production. For measurement of the average production performance, we use the known productivity ratio

- Real output / Real input.

The absolute income of performance is obtained by subtracting the real input from the real output as follows:

- Real income (abs.) = Real output – Real input

The growth of the real income is the increase of the economic value that can be distributed between the production stakeholders. With the aid of the production model we can perform the average and absolute accounting in one calculation. Maximizing production performance requires using the absolute measure, i.e. the real income and its derivatives as a criterion of production performance.

Maximizing productivity also leads to the phenomenon called "jobless growth" This refers to economic growth as a result of productivity growth but without creation of new jobs and new incomes from them. A practical example illustrates the case. When a jobless person obtains a job in market production we may assume it is a low productivity job. As a result, average productivity decreases but the real income per capita increases. Furthermore, the well-being of the society also grows. This example reveals the difficulty to interpret the total productivity change correctly. The combination of volume increase and total productivity decrease leads in this case to the improved performance because we are on the “diminishing returns” area of the production function. If we are on the part of “increasing returns” on the production function, the combination of production volume increase and total productivity increase leads to improved production performance. Unfortunately, we do not know in practice on which part of the production function we are. Therefore, a correct interpretation of a performance change is obtained only by measuring the real income change.

== Production function ==
In the short run, the production function assumes there is at least one fixed factor input. The production function relates the quantity of factor inputs used by a business to the amount of output that result. There are three measure of production and productivity. The first one is total output (total product). It is straightforward to measure how much output is being produced in the manufacturing industries like motor vehicles. In the tertiary industry such as service or knowledge industries, it is harder to measure the outputs since they are less tangible.

The second way of measuring production and efficiency is average output. It measures output per-worker-employed or output-per-unit of capital. The third measures of production and efficiency is the marginal product. It is the change in output from increasing the number of workers used by one person, or by adding one more machine to the production process in the short run.

The law of diminishing marginal returns points out that as more units of a variable input are added to fixed amounts of land and capital, the change in total output would rise firstly and then fall.

The length of time required for all the factor of production to be flexible varies from industry to industry. For example, in the nuclear power industry, it takes many years to commission new nuclear power plant and capacity.

Real-life examples of the firm's short - term production equations may not be quite the same as the smooth production theory of the department. In order to improve efficiency and promote the structural transformation of economic growth, it is most important to establish the industrial development model related to it. At the same time, a shift should be made to models that contain typical characteristics of the industry, such as specific technological changes and significant differences in the likelihood of substitution before and after investment.

== Production models ==
A production model is a numerical description of the production process and is based on the prices and the quantities of inputs and outputs. There are two main approaches to operationalize the concept of production function. We can use mathematical formulae, which are typically used in macroeconomics (in growth accounting) or arithmetical models, which are typically used in microeconomics and management accounting. We do not present the former approach here but refer to the survey “Growth accounting” by Hulten 2009. Also see an extensive discussion of various production models and their estimations in Sickles and Zelenyuk (2019, Chapter 1-2).

We use here arithmetical models because they are like the models of management accounting, illustrative and easily understood and applied in practice. Furthermore, they are integrated to management accounting, which is a practical advantage. A major advantage of the arithmetical model is its capability to depict production function as a part of production process. Consequently, production function can be understood, measured, and examined as a part of production process.

There are different production models according to different interests. Here we use a production income model and a production analysis model in order to demonstrate production function as a phenomenon and a measurable quantity.

=== Production income model ===
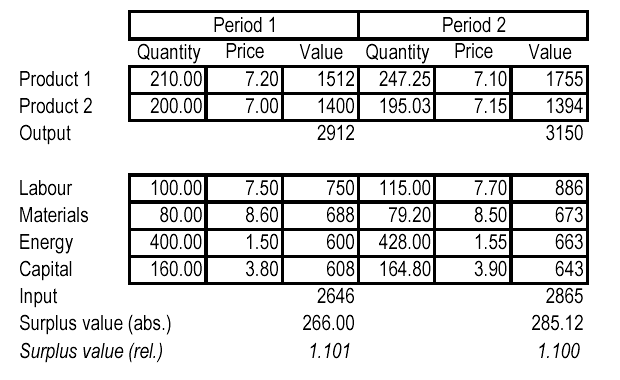
Profitability of production measured by surplus value (Saari 2006,3)

The scale of success run by a going concern is manifold, and there are no criteria that might be universally applicable to success. Nevertheless, there is one criterion by which we can generalise the rate of success in production. This criterion is the ability to produce surplus value. As a criterion of profitability, surplus value refers to the difference between returns and costs, taking into consideration the costs of equity in addition to the costs included in the profit and loss statement as usual. Surplus value indicates that the output has more value than the sacrifice made for it, in other words, the output value is higher than the value (production costs) of the used inputs. If the surplus value is positive, the owner's profit expectation has been surpassed.

The table presents a surplus value calculation. We call this set of production data a basic example and we use the data through the article in illustrative production models. The basic example is a simplified profitability calculation used for illustration and modelling. Even as reduced, it comprises all phenomena of a real measuring situation and most importantly the change in the output-input mix between two periods. Hence, the basic example works as an illustrative “scale model” of production without any features of a real measuring situation being lost. In practice, there may be hundreds of products and inputs but the logic of measuring does not differ from that presented in the basic example.

In this context, we define the quality requirements for the production data used in productivity accounting. The most important criterion of good measurement is the homogenous quality of the measurement object. If the object is not homogenous, then the measurement result may include changes in both quantity and quality but their respective shares will remain unclear. In productivity accounting this criterion requires that every item of output and input must appear in accounting as being homogenous. In other words, the inputs and the outputs are not allowed to be aggregated in measuring and accounting. If they are aggregated, they are no longer homogenous and hence the measurement results may be biased.

Both the absolute and relative surplus value have been calculated in the example. Absolute value is the difference of the output and input values and the relative value is their relation, respectively. The surplus value calculation in the example is at a nominal price, calculated at the market price of each period.

=== Production analysis model ===
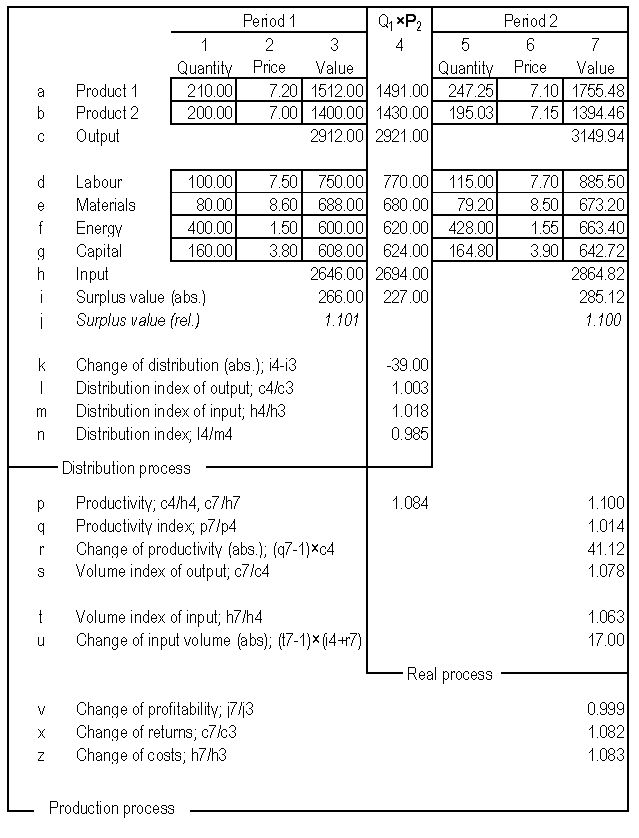
Production Model Saari 2004 (Saari 2006,4)

A model used here is a typical production analysis model by help of which it is possible to calculate the outcome of the real process, income distribution process and production process. The starting point is a profitability calculation using surplus value as a criterion of profitability. The surplus value calculation is the only valid measure for understanding the connection between profitability and productivity or understanding the connection between real process and production process. A valid measurement of total productivity necessitates considering all production inputs, and the surplus value calculation is the only calculation to conform to the requirement. If we omit an input in productivity or income accounting, this means that the omitted input can be used unlimitedly in production without any cost impact on accounting results.

=== Accounting and interpreting ===
The process of calculating is best understood by applying the term ceteris paribus, i.e. "all other things being the same," stating that at a time only the impact of one changing factor be introduced to the phenomenon being examined. Therefore, the calculation can be presented as a process advancing step by step. First, the impacts of the income distribution process are calculated, and then, the impacts of the real process on the profitability of the production.

The first step of the calculation is to separate the impacts of the real process and the income distribution process, respectively, from the change in profitability (285.12 – 266.00 = 19.12). This takes place by simply creating one auxiliary column (4) in which a surplus value calculation is compiled using the quantities of Period 1 and the prices of Period 2. In the resulting profitability calculation, Columns 3 and 4 depict the impact of a change in income distribution process on the profitability and in Columns 4 and 7 the impact of a change in real process on the profitability.

The accounting results are easily interpreted and understood. We see that the real income has increased by 58.12 units from which 41.12 units come from the increase of productivity growth and the rest 17.00 units come from the production volume growth. The total increase of real income (58.12) is distributed to the stakeholders of production, in this case, 39.00 units to the customers and to the suppliers of inputs and the rest 19.12 units to the owners.

Here we can make an important conclusion. Income formation of production is always a balance between income generation and income distribution. The income change created in a real process (i.e. by production function) is always distributed to the stakeholders as economic values within the review period. Accordingly, the changes in real income and income distribution are always equal in terms of economic value.

Based on the accounted changes of productivity and production volume values we can explicitly conclude on which part of the production function the production is. The rules of interpretations are the following:

The production is on the part of “increasing returns” on the production function, when

- productivity and production volume increase or
- productivity and production volume decrease

The production is on the part of “diminishing returns” on the production function, when

- productivity decreases and volume increases or
- productivity increases and volume decreases.

In the basic example, the combination of volume growth (+17.00) and productivity growth (+41.12) reports explicitly that the production is on the part of “increasing returns” on the production function (Saari 2006 a, 138–144).

Another production model (Production Model Saari 1989) also gives details of the income distribution (Saari 2011,14). Because the accounting techniques of the two models are different, they give differing, although complementary, analytical information. The accounting results are, however, identical. We do not present the model here in detail but we only use its detailed data on income distribution, when the objective functions are formulated in the next section.

== Objective functions ==
An efficient way to improve the understanding of production performance is to formulate different objective functions according to the objectives of the different interest groups. Formulating the objective function necessitates defining the variable to be maximized (or minimized). After that other variables are considered as constraints or free variables. The most familiar objective function is profit maximization which is also included in this case. Profit maximization is an objective function that stems from the owner's interest and all other variables are constraints in relation to maximizing of profits in the organization.

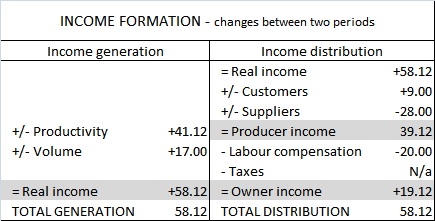
Summary of objective function formulations (Saari 2011, 17)

=== The procedure for formulating objective functions ===
The procedure for formulating different objective functions, in terms of the production model, is introduced next. In the income formation from production the following objective functions can be identified:

- Maximizing the real income
- Maximizing the producer income
- Maximizing the owner income.

These cases are illustrated using the numbers from the basic example. The following symbols are used in the presentation: The equal sign (=) signifies the starting point of the computation or the result of computing and the plus or minus sign (+ / -) signifies a variable that is to be added or subtracted from the function. A producer means here the producer community, i.e. labour force, society and owners.

Objective function formulations can be expressed in a single calculation which concisely illustrates the logic of the income generation, the income distribution and the variables to be maximized.

The calculation resembles an income statement starting with the income generation and ending with the income distribution. The income generation and the distribution are always in balance so that their amounts are equal. In this case, it is 58.12 units. The income which has been generated in the real process is distributed to the stakeholders during the same period. There are three variables that can be maximized. They are the real income, the producer income and the owner income. Producer income and owner income are practical quantities because they are addable quantities and they can be computed quite easily. Real income is normally not an addable quantity and in many cases it is difficult to calculate.

=== The dual approach for the formulation ===
The change of real income can also be computed from the changes in income distribution. One will need to identify the unit price changes of outputs and inputs and calculate their profit impacts (i.e. unit price change x quantity). The change of real income is the sum of these profit impacts and the change of owner income. This approach is called the dual approach because the framework is seen in terms of prices instead of quantities (ONS 3, 23).

The dual approach has been recognized in growth accounting for long but its interpretation has remained unclear. The following question has remained unanswered: “Quantity based estimates of the residual are interpreted as a shift in the production function, but what is the interpretation of the price-based growth estimates?” (Hulten 2009, 18). The real income change is achieved by quantitative changes in production and the income distribution change to the stakeholders is its dual. In this case, the duality means that the same accounting result is obtained by accounting the change of the total income generation (real income) and by accounting the change of the total income distribution.

== See also ==
- Adaptive strategies
- A list of production functions
- Assembly line
- Johann Heinrich von Thünen
- Division of labour
- Industrial Revolution
- Cost-of-production theory of value
- Computer-aided manufacturing
- DIRTI 5
- Distribution (economics)
- Factors of production
- Outline of industrial organization
- Outline of production
- Output (economics)
- Prices of production
- Pricing strategies
- Product (business)
- Production function
- Production theory basics
- Production possibility frontier
- Productive and unproductive labour
- Productive forces
- Productivism
- Productivity
- Productivity model
- Productivity improving technologies (historical)
- Microeconomics
- Mode of production
- Mass production
- Second Industrial Revolution

== Further references and external links ==
- Moroney, J. R. (1967) "Cobb-Douglass production functions and returns to scale in US manufacturing industry", Western Economic Journal, vol 6, no 1, December 1967, pp 39–51.
- Pearl, D. and Enos, J. (1975) "Engineering production functions and technological progress", The Journal of Industrial Economics, vol 24, September 1975, pp 55–72.
- Robinson, J. (1953) "The production function and the theory of capital", Review of Economic Studies, vol XXI, 1953, pp. 81–106
- Anwar Shaikh, "Laws of Production and Laws of Algebra: The Humbug Production Function", in The Review of Economics and Statistics, Volume 56(1), February 1974, pp. 115–120. Wayback Machine
- Anwar Shaikh, "Laws of Production and Laws of Algebra – Humbug II", in Growth, Profits and Property ed. by Edward J. Nell. Cambridge, Cambridge University Press, 1980. Wayback Machine
- Anwar Shaikh, "Nonlinear Dynamics and Pseudo-Production Functions", 2008.
- Shephard, R (1970). Theory of cost and production functions, Princeton University Press, Princeton NJ.
- Sickles, R., and Zelenyuk, V. (2019). "Measurement of Productivity and Efficiency: Theory and Practice". Cambridge: Cambridge University Press. doi:10.1017/9781139565981
- Thompson, A. (1981). Economics of the firm, Theory and practice, 3r d edition, Prentice Hall, Englewood Cliffs. ISBN 0-13-231423-1
- Elmer G. Wiens: Production Functions – Models of the Cobb-Douglas, C.E.S., Trans-Log, and Diewert Production Functions.
