= Economic return =

Income or output generated from economic inputs or investments

Economic returns are the gains in output, income, or value, which are generated from the employment of productive inputs or resources. The concept encompasses three related but distinct ideas depending on context:

- The distribution of income among factors of production (wages, rent, interest, and profit).
- The relationship between changes in inputs and resulting changes in output (returns to scale, marginal returns).
- The surplus generated above all costs, including opportunity costs (economic profit).

Economic returns can be thought of as the counterpart to cost. Every payment to a factor of production is simultaneously a cost to the payer and a return to the recipient.

== History ==
Adam Smith's discussion of the division of labor in The Wealth of Nations (1776) examined how specialization raises productivity and thus the returns to labor and capital. David Ricardo, in his Essay on Profits (1815) and Principles of Political Economy and Taxation (1817), formalized the idea of diminishing returns applied to agricultural land. Ricardo argued that as population grows and inferior soils are brought into cultivation, rents rise and profits fall.

John Stuart Mill and later Alfred Marshall extended classical analysis, distinguishing between short-run and long-run returns and between returns internal and external to the firm. The neoclassical revolution of the late 1800s, through the work of Jevons, Menger, Walras, and Marshall, reframed returns in terms of marginal productivity, grounding factor payments in the marginal product of each input. In the 1900s, Paul Samuelson, Robert Solow, and others embedded returns analysis within growth theory and general equilibrium frameworks.

== Factor returns ==
In classical and neoclassical economics, the total output of an economy is distributed among the factors of production. Each factor earns a return corresponding to its contribution to production.

=== Wages ===
Wages are the return to labor, the compensation paid for human effort, both physical and cognitive, employed in the production of goods and services. In neoclassical theory, the wage rate in a competitive market equals the marginal revenue product of labor. Wages may be realized in money or in kind; a subsistence farmer who harvests crops for personal consumption realizes wages in the form of those goods.

=== Rent ===
In classical economics, rent was the return to land, arising because land is fixed in supply and varies in quality. Ricardo showed that rents are determined by the differential productivity of land relative to the least productive ("marginal") land in use. Neoclassical economics generalized this to economic rent: any payment to a factor in excess of its opportunity cost, or the minimum payment required to keep it in its current employment. Economic rent can therefore accrue to any factor that is in inelastic supply, including unique labor talent or intellectual property protected by barriers to entry.

=== Interest ===
Interest is the return to capital, the provision of funds or durable productive assets, over time. It compensates lenders or investors for forgoing present consumption, bearing risk, and surrendering liquidity. In classical economics, interest was the return on loaned money capital; in broader usage it includes the implicit return earned on any owned productive asset. In neoclassical theory, the rate of interest tends toward the marginal product of capital in competitive equilibrium.

=== Profit ===
Profit is the return to entrepreneurship and risk-bearing. In classical economics, profit accrued to the proprietor of capital after paying wages, rent, and interest. In neoclassical economics, economic profit is the surplus remaining after all factors, including the entrepreneur's own time and capital, are compensated at their opportunity cost. A firm earning zero economic profit is earning a "normal profit", just enough to keep resources employed in their current use. Positive economic profit signals that value is being created above and beyond what resources could earn elsewhere; negative economic profit (economic loss) signals misallocation of resources.

== Returns in production ==
A separate but related usage of "returns" concerns how output responds to changes in inputs.

=== Returns to scale ===
Returns to scale describe how total output changes when all inputs are increased proportionally in the long run, when all factors are variable.

Piero Sraffa raised fundamental criticisms of incorporating both increasing and decreasing returns within a partial equilibrium framework. Sraffa argued that the two concepts belong to different domains of theory, production and distribution respectively, and thus cannot be straightforwardly combined without violating the ceteris paribus conditions that partial equilibrium requires.

=== Marginal returns and diminishing returns ===
Marginal returns measure the additional output obtained by adding one unit of a variable input while other inputs are constant. The law of diminishing marginal returns states that, beyond some point, successive additions of a variable input to fixed inputs will yield progressively smaller increments of output.

The law was first conceptualized in discussions of agricultural productivity during the 1700s. Jacques Turgot argued that each incremental addition of labor to land would be "less and less productive". In 1815, Ricardo, Thomas Malthus, Edward West, and Robert Torrens independently applied the principle to the theory of rent. The law is now considered a foundational principle of microeconomics and underlies the U-shaped average cost curve in standard production theory.

=== Returns in growth theory ===
In macroeconomic growth theory, the behavior of returns to capital is central to explaining long-run growth patterns.

The Solow-Swan model assumes diminishing returns to capital: as capital per worker accumulates, the marginal product of capital declines, and the economy converges to a steady state where growth is driven only by exogenous technological progress.

Endogenous growth models challenge this by incorporating mechanisms, such as knowledge spillovers, human capital, or research and development, that generate non-diminishing or even increasing returns at the aggregate level, allowing for sustained per capita growth without exogenous technical change.

== Economic profit and opportunity cost ==
The concept of economic returns in its most precise modern sense refers to the gain from an activity net of all costs, including opportunity costs.

Economic profit is defined as:

$$\text{Economic profit} = \text{Total revenue} - \text{Explicit costs} - \text{Implicit costs}$$

where implicit costs include the opportunity cost of the owner's time, the forgone return on invested capital, and any other resource the owner could have deployed elsewhere.

This contrasts with accounting profit, which subtracts only explicit (cash) costs. A business may earn positive accounting profit while incurring negative economic returns, meaning its resources would generate more value in another use.

== Investment returns ==
In finance and investment analysis, "return" typically refers to the gain on a financial asset relative to its cost, over a period of time. Total Investment Return includes both income components (dividends, interest, rents) and capital gains (or losses) due to changes in asset market value.

The rate of return is commonly expressed as:

$$r = \frac{V_t - V_0 + D}{V_0}$$

where V_{0} is the initial value, V_{t} is the terminal value, and D is any income received during the period.

Financial economics distinguishes between nominal returns (unadjusted for inflation) and real returns (adjusted for the change in the general price level). Risk-adjusted returns account for the uncertainty borne by the investor; standard frameworks such as the Capital Asset Pricing Model (CAPM) and the Fama-French factor models attempt to explain cross-sectional variation in asset returns by exposure to systematic risk factors.

== See also ==
- Marginal product
- Solow residual
