= Reiner Kümmel =

German physicist (born 1939)

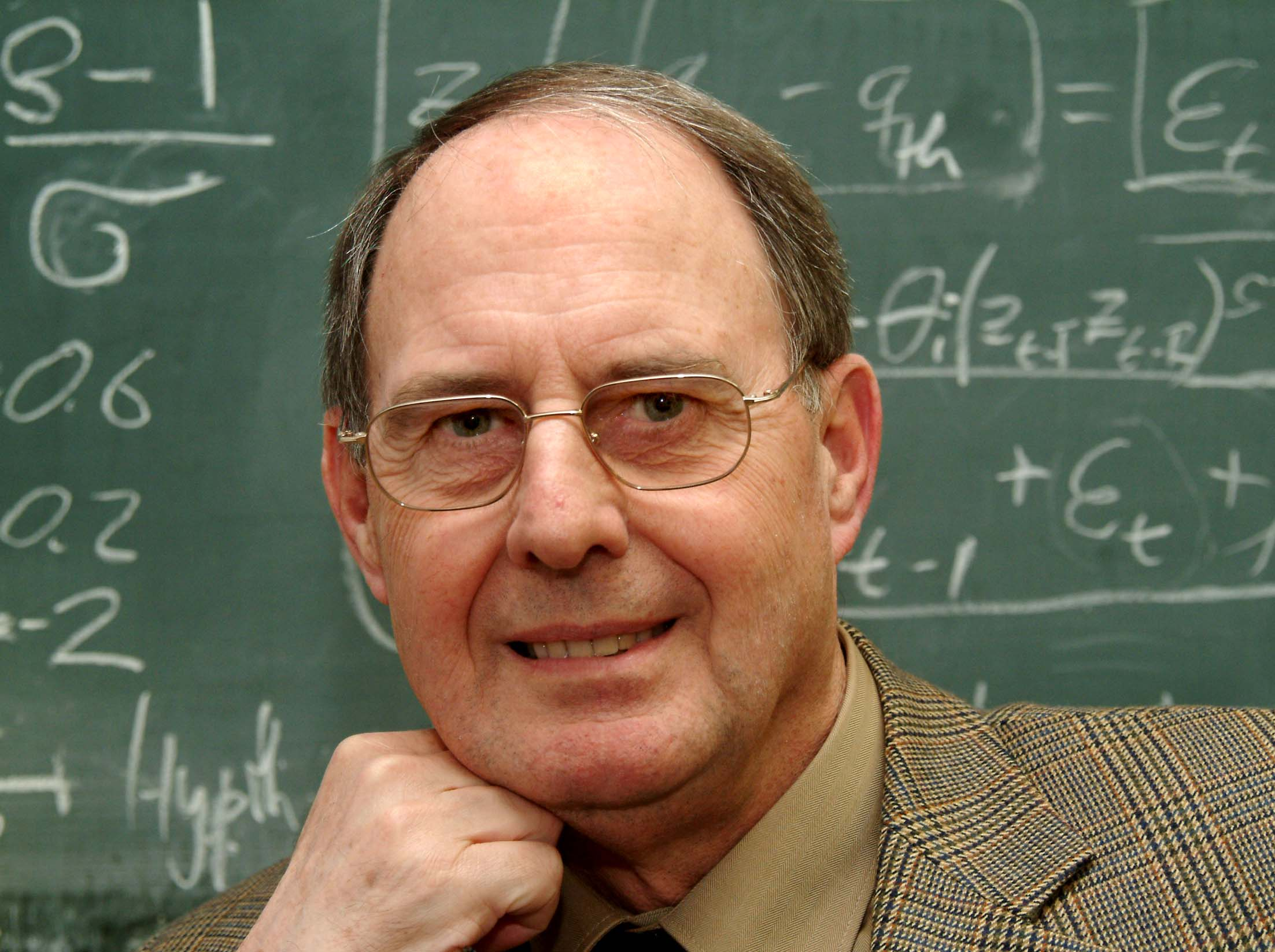
- Reiner Kümmel in March 2005, photographed by Thomas Obermeier
- Born: 1939-07-09; Fulda, Germany
- Education: TH Darmstadt, Goethe Universität Frankfurt
- Known for: LINEX-function for exogenous growth model
- Scientific career
- Fields: physics & economics
- Workplaces: Universidad del Valle, University of Würzburg
- Thesis: A: Schichtdicken-abhängiger Quantisierungseffekt in Tunnelkontakten : B: Untersuchungen zum Zwischenzustand und gemischten Zustand von Supraleitern 1. und 2. Art (1968)
- Doctoral advisor: Peter Fulde
- Other academic advisors: John Bardeen

Reiner Kümmel (born 9 July 1939) is a German physicist specialised in solid-state physics, thermodynamics and econophysics.

== Scientific career ==
Reiner Kümmel studied physics and mathematics at TH Darmstadt from 1959 to 1964. He received a scholarship from the Cusanuswerk and completed his doctorate on superconductivity at Frankfurt University in 1968, where he also habilitated in theoretical physics in 1973. During his doctorate and habilitation, he also conducted research abroad, such as from 1965 to 1967 as a research assistant under the two-time Nobel Prize winner in physics John Bardeen at the University of Illinois at Urbana-Champaign. From 1970 to 1972, he worked in Colombia at the Universidad del Valle in Cali, where he helped to set up a master's programme in physics on a DAAD scholarship, which served to develop the next generation of academics. During this time, he focussed on thermodynamics.

In 1974, he took up a professorship for theoretical physics in Würzburg, which was also characterised by numerous research visits abroad. In the 1970s, the time of the first and second oil price shocks, his interest in economics as a second mainstay began to grow. A lively exchange developed with Wolfgang Eichhorn, who worked as an economist (and mathematician) at the Faculty of Economics at the University of Karlsruhe. His research in physics focussed on the theory of inhomogeneous superconductors and mesoscopic heterocontacts. His economic interests focussed on energy use and emission reduction. From 1996 to 1998, Reiner Kümmel chaired the Energy Working Group of the German Physical Society. He retired in October 2004 from University of Würzburg. Nevertheless, he remained associated with the university with a teaching assignment for the lecture Thermodynamics and Economics until the summer semester 2015. He is a member of the editorial board of Biophysical Economics and Sustainability.

== Work ==
Kümmel's work on economics intends to improve the mathematical structure of macroeconomic growth models for industrial countries, so that they do not contradict the fundamental laws of physics, in particular the first and second law of thermodynamics. He identified energy as a powerful factor of production and the dominant component of technological progress. To address these issues amongst others, he developed the so-called LINEX function, which depends linearly on energy and exponentially on quotients of the production factors capital, labor, and energy.

The LINEX production function is calculated by integrating the growth equation for economic output and three coupled differential equations for the economic weights of capital, labor, and energy, i.e. the output elasticities. These are subject to constant returns to scale (Euler condition) and appropriate asymptotic boundary conditions. The LINEX function forgoes the cost-share theorem applied in standard economic theory. This theorem assumes that the economic weights (elasticities) of capital, labor and energy are equal to their cost-shares in the national accounts and national statistics, respectively. Thus capital and labor would be the main factors of production; as such they appear in the constant output elasticities of the often-used Cobb–Douglas production function, which is the simplest solution of the differential equations. The time-dependent parameters in the output elasticities of the LINEX function are determined econometrically using statistical methods.

Kümmel, and colleague Dietmar Lindenberger first fit the LINEX function using electricity as a proxy for the useful work from energy inputs. The resulting fits were able reproduce observed historical economic growth without assumptions of exogenous and unexplained technological progress. In subsequent work, inspired and informed by Kümmel's findings, Robert Ayres and Benjamin Warr replaced electricity in the function with the useful work from exergy inputs to the US economy (for the period 1900 to 2000) to the LINEX production function to similar effect.

With the use of useful work as input factor, the unexplained growth the "Solow Residual" from Solow's growth model, which is often attributed to exogenous technological progress or total factor productivity, is minimised. Consequently, so called technological progress in neoclassical models can be explained, in large part, as the ability of mankind to integrate increasing energy flows into the economic process and to transform it with high efficiency into useful work. It then follows that energy's economic weight is much larger than its cost share, and that energy is a powerful factor of production and a dominant component of "technological progress". As Kümmel states "we owe a substantial part of our material wealth to energy conversion in the machines of the capital stock".

In his book The Second Law of Economics, he discusses the influence of energy conservation and entropy on prosperity and adds to the production theory of economics the important scientific component of energy, without which a modern economy cannot be understood. He calls for energy taxes to alleviate the pressure to grow, based on the much higher production elasticity of energy than labour. The current trend is the replacement of labor-capital combinations by energy-capital tuples.

== Impact beyond academia ==
Kümmel's economic work has been featured and cited by a variety of organizations, particularly as it relates to energy policy. In 1990, the World Bank featured Kümmel's work on the economics of pollution control in its Environment Working Paper series. The International Monetary Fund of the United Nations released a series of economic recovery models that drew on Kümmel's work to estimate the effect of oil prices on economic growth and recovery in 2011, and cited his work further in a working paper on oil and the world economy in 2012. In 2015, a renewable energy plan commissioned by San Diego County recommended green energy investment on the basis of Kümmel's economic theories. Kümmel's work has also been cited by white papers and working papers from a variety of nonprofit and advocacy groups, including the American Coalition for Clean Coal Electricity, the American Council for an Energy-Efficient Economy, the Institute for Governance & Sustainable Development, and the Vereinigung für Ökologische Ökonomie.

== Publications ==
=== Solid-state Physics ===
- Arne Jacobs, Reiner Kümmel: Dynamics of conversion of supercurrents into normal currents and vice versa. In: Phys. Rev. B, Vol. 64, No. 10, Aug. 2001, p. 104515.
- S. Hofmann, R. Kümmel, Moving vortex line: Electronic structure, Andreev scattering, and Magnus force. In: Phys. Rev. B, Vol. 57, No. 13, April 1998, pp. 7904–7915.
- O.-J. Wacker, R. Kümmel, E.K.U. Gross: Time dependent density functional theory for superconductors. In: Phys. Rev. Letters, Vol. 73, No. 21, Nov. 1994, pp. 2915–2918.
- Bodo Huckestein, Reiner Kümmel: Oscillating Magnetization of Quantum-Well Electrons in a Parallel Magnetic Field. In: Phys. Rev. B, Vol. 38, No. 12, Oct. 1988, pp. 8215–8218.
- J. Bardeen, R. Kümmel, A.E. Jacobs, L. Tewordt: Structure of Vortex Lines in Pure Superconductors. In: Phys. Rev., Vol. 187, No. 2, Nov. 1969, pp. 556–569.

=== Economics ===
- Reiner Kümmel, Dietmar Lindenberger: Energy, Entropy, Constraints, and Creativity in Economic Growth and Crises. In: Entropy. Band 22, Nr. 10, 14. Oktober 2020, ISSN 1099-4300, 1156.
- Reiner Kümmel, Dietmar Lindenberger, Florian Weiser: The economic power of energy and the need to integrate it with energy policy. In: Energy Policy, Vol. 86, 2015, pp. 833–843.
- Reiner Kümmel, Dietmar Lindenberger: How energy conversion drives economic growth far from the equilibrium of neoclassical economics. In: New Journal of Physics 16, Dec. 2014, 125008.
- Reiner Kümmel: Why energy's economic weight is much larger than its cost share In: Environmental Innovation and Societal Transitions 9, Dec. 2013.
- Reiner Kümmel: The Second Law of Economics: Energy, Entropy, and the Origins of Wealth. Springer, Berlin 2011, ISBN 978-1-4419-9364-9.
- Reiner Kümmel, Robert U. Ayres, Dietmar Lindenberger: Thermodynamic laws, economic methods and the productive power of energy. In: Journal of Non-Equilibrium Thermodynamics, Vol. 35, No. 2, 2010, pp. 145–179.
- Reiner Kümmel, Wolfgang Strassl, Alfred Gossner, Wolfgang Eichhorn: Technical Progress and Energy Dependent Production Functions. In: Zeitschrift für Nationalökonomie - Journal of Economics, Vol. 45, 1985, pp. 285–311.

== See also ==
- The Entropy Law and the Economic Process
- Ecological economics
- Robert Ayres
