= Capital intensity =

Economic concept

Capital intensity

Capital intensity is the amount of fixed or real capital present in relation to other factors of production, especially labor. At the level of either a production process or the aggregate economy, it may be estimated by the capital to labor ratio, such as from the points along a capital/labor isoquant. The inverse of capital intensity is labor intensity. Capital intensity is sometimes associated with industrialism, while labor intensity is sometimes associated with agrarianism.

== Growth ==
The use of tools and machinery makes labor more effective, so rising capital intensity (or "capital deepening") pushes up the productivity of labor. Capital-intensive societies tend to have a higher standard of living over the long run.

Calculations made by Robert Solow claimed that economic growth was mainly driven by technological progress (productivity growth) rather than inputs of capital and labor. However recent economic research has invalidated that theory, since Solow did not properly consider changes in both investment and labor inputs.

Dale Jorgenson, of Harvard University, President of the American Economic Association in 2000, concludes that: 'Griliches and I showed that changes in the quality of capital and labor inputs and the quality of investment goods explained most of the Solow residual. We estimated that capital and labor inputs accounted for 85 percent of growth during the period 1945–1965, while only 15 percent could be attributed to productivity growth… This has precipitated the sudden obsolescence of earlier productivity research employing the conventions of Kuznets and Solow.'

John Ross has analysed the long term correlation between the level of investment in the economy, rising from 5-7% of GDP at the time of the Industrial Revolution in England, to 25% of GDP in the post-war German 'economic miracle', to over 35% of GDP in the world's most rapidly growing contemporary economies of India and China.

Taking the G7 and other largest economies, Jorgenson and Vu conclude: 'the growth of world output between input growth and productivity… input growth greatly predominated… Productivity growth accounted for only one-fifth of the total during 1989-1995, while input growth accounted for almost four-fifths. Similarly, input growth accounted for more than 70 percent of growth after 1995, while productivity accounted for less than 30 percent.'

Regarding differences in output per capita Jorgenson and Vu conclude: 'differences in per capita output levels are primarily explained by differences in per capital input, rather than variations in productivity'.

Some economists claimed that the Soviet Union missed the lessons of the Solow growth model, because starting in the 1930s, the Stalin government attempted to force capital accumulation through state direction of the economy. However, Solow's calculations have been proven invalid, so this is a poor explanation. Modern research shows the main factor for economic growth is the growth of labor and capital inputs, not increases in productivity. Therefore, other factors besides capital accumulation must have been big contributors to the Soviet economic crisis.

Free market economists tend to believe that capital accumulation should not be managed by government, but instead be determined by market forces. Monetary stability (which increases confidence), low taxation, and greater freedom for the entrepreneur would then promote capital accumulation.

The Austrian School maintains that the capital intensity of any industry is due to the roundaboutness of the particular industry and consumer demand.

== Capital-intensive industry ==
Capital-intensive industry uses a large portion of capital to buy expensive machines, compared to their labor costs. The term came about in the mid- to late-nineteenth century as factories such as steel mills sprung up around the newly industrialized world. With the added expense of machinery, there was greater financial risk. This makes new capital-intensive factories with high tech machinery a small share of the marketplace, even though they raise productivity and output. Some businesses commonly thought to be capital-intensive are railways, aircraft manufacturing, airlines, oil production and refining, telecommunications, semiconductor fabrication, mining, chemical plants, electric power plants, etc.

== Measurement ==
The degree of capital intensity is easy to measure in nominal terms. It is simply the ratio of the total money value of capital equipment to the total potential output. However, this measure need not be related to real economic activity because it can rise due to inflation. Then the question arises, how do we measure the "real" amount of capital goods? Do we use book value (historical price)? or replacement cost? or the price justified by the present discounted value of future profits? Or do we simply "deflate" the total current money value of capital equipment by the average price of capital goods?

This capital controversy points out that measure of capital intensity is not independent of the distribution of income, so that changes in the ratio of profits to wages lead to changes in measured capital intensity.

== See also ==
- Labor intensity
- Organic composition of capital
