= Golden Rule savings rate =

Rate of savings which maximizes steady state level of the growth of consumption

In economics, the Golden Rule savings rate is the rate of savings which maximizes steady state level of the growth of consumption, as for example in the Solow–Swan model. Although the concept can be found earlier in the work of John von Neumann and Maurice Allais, the term is generally attributed to Edmund Phelps who wrote in 1961 that the golden rule "do unto others as you would have them do unto you" could be applied inter-generationally inside the model to arrive at some form of "optimum", or put simply "do unto future generations as we hope previous generations did unto us."

In the Solow growth model, a steady state savings rate of 100% implies that all income is going to investment capital for future production, implying a steady state consumption level of zero. A savings rate of 0% implies that no new investment capital is being created, so that the capital stock depreciates without replacement. This makes a steady state unsustainable except at zero output, which again implies a consumption level of zero. Somewhere in between is the "Golden Rule" level of savings, where the savings propensity is such that per-capita consumption is at its maximum possible constant value. Put another way, the golden-rule capital stock relates to the highest level of permanent consumption which can be sustained.

== Derivation of the golden-rule savings rate ==
The following arguments are presented more completely in Chapter 1 of Barro and Sala-i-Martin and in texts such as Abel et al..

Let k be the capital/labour ratio (i.e., capital per capita), y be the resulting per capita output ($y = f(k)$), and s be the savings rate. The steady state is defined as a situation in which per capita output is unchanging, which implies that k be constant. This requires that the amount of saved output be exactly what is needed to (1) equip any additional workers and (2) replace any worn out capital.

In a steady state, therefore: $s f(k) = (n+d)k$, where n is the constant exogenous population growth rate, and d is the constant exogenous rate of depreciation of capital. Since n and d are constant and $f(k)$ satisfies the Inada conditions, this expression may be read as an equation connecting s and k in steady state: any choice of s implies a unique value for k (thus also for y) in steady state. Since consumption is proportional to output ($c = (1-s)f(k)$), then a choice of value for s implies a unique level of steady state per capita consumption. Out of all possible choices for s, one will produce the highest possible steady state value for c and is called the golden rule savings rate.

An important question for policy-makers is whether the economy is saving too much or too little. Given the interconnection of s and k in steady state, noted above, the question can be phrased: "How much capital per worker (k) is needed to achieve the maximum level of consumption per worker in the steady state?"

To discover the optimal capital/labour ratio, and thus the golden rule savings rate, first note that consumption can be seen as the residual output that remains after providing for the investment that maintains steady state: $c = f(k) - (n+d)k$

Differential calculus methods can identify which steady state value for the capital/labour ratio maximises per capita consumption. The golden rule savings rate is then implied by the connection between s and k in steady state (see above).

In detail, if $k^G$ is the golden rule steady state level of k, then $k = k^G$ requires $dc/dk = 0$, i.e.$df/dk - (n+d)= 0$

$\mbox{Golden rule for capital/labour ratio: } \frac{ df }{ dk } = (n+d)$

The Inada conditions ensure that this rule is satisfied by a unique $k = k^G$ and thus produces a unique $y^G = f(k^G)$. Since steady state requires a particular level of investment, i.e., saved output: $i^G = (n+d)k^G$, then the golden rule savings rate must be whatever is required to generate this;

$\mbox{Golden rule savings rate: } s^G=\frac{(n+d)k^G}{f(k^G)}$

Given the rule for optimal k, this may also be expressed as:

$\mbox{Golden rule savings rate: } s^G=\frac{mpk^G}{apk^G}$

in which $mpk^G$ is the marginal product of capital ($df(k)/dk$) at the optimal value of k and $apk^G$ is the corresponding average product of capital ($f(k)/k$).

The actual values of $k^G$, $y^G$, $apk^G$, and $s^G$ depend upon the precise specification of the production function $f(k)$. For example, a Cobb–Douglas specification with constant returns to scale has $y=f(k)=k^a$, hence $apk=k^{(a-1)}$ and $mpk=ak^{(a-1)}$. This gives $s^G=a$ and hence $k^G=(a/(n+d))^{1/(1-a)}$, $y^G=(a/(n+d))^{a/(1-a)}$.

== Policy effects on the savings rate ==
Various economic policies can have an effect on the savings rate and, given data about whether an economy is saving too much or too little, can in turn be used to approach the Golden Rule level of savings. Consumption taxes, for example, may reduce the level of consumption and increase the savings rate, whereas capital gains taxes may reduce the savings rate. These policies are often known as savings incentives in the West, where it is felt that the prevailing savings rate is "too low" (below the Golden Rule rate), and consumption incentives in countries like Japan where demand is widely considered to be too weak because the savings rate is "too high" (above the Golden Rule). (Note: Since the golden rule applies only in the steady state an economy not in that state "should not" aspire to the golden rule savings rate, even if the precepts of neo-classical economics growth theory are accepted. For example, the Soviet Union had a famously high savings rate policy in an attempt to "catch up" to the West, the fact that this lowered present consumption below the golden rule rate was justified with the argument that capital accumulation was necessary to reach the world level of industrialization, but that this was a short-term policy of capital deepening.)

=== Private and public saving ===
Japan's high rate of private saving is offset by its high public debt. A simple approximation of this is that the government has borrowed 100% of GDP from its own citizens backed only with the promise to pay from future taxation. This does not necessarily lead to capital formation through investment (if the revenue from bond sales is spent on present government consumption rather than infrastructure development, say).

=== Golden rule taxes within economic models ===
If consumption tax rates are expected to be permanent then it is hard to reconcile the common hypothesis that rising rates discourage consumption with rational expectations (since the ultimate purpose of saving is consumption). However, consumption taxes tend to vary (e.g., with changes in government or movement between countries), and so currently high consumption taxes may be expected to go away at some point in the future, creating an increased incentive for saving. The efficient level of capital income tax in the steady state has been studied in the context of a general equilibrium model and Judd (1985) has shown that the optimal tax rate is zero. However, Chamley (1986) says that in reaching the steady state (in the short run) a high capital income tax is an efficient revenue source.

== Other versions of the Golden Rule of accumulation ==
The Golden Rule was, according to Allais, first stated by Jacques Desrousseaux in 1959 in an unpublished paper, see also Desrousseaux. The rule was also independently discovered by Edmund Phelps, Carl-Christian von Weizsäcker, and Trevor Swan in the neoclassical setting. Joan Robinson established the rule independently in a growth model with fixed proportions and technological change, referring to differential rents, and dubbed it "the neoclassical theorem". Ekkehart Schlicht has shown that the rule applies also to a Kaldorian growth model where marginal productivities and differential rents are not defined.

== See also ==
- Generational accounting
- Intergenerational equity
