= Backstop resources =

Theory in resource economics

Backstop resources theory states that as a heavily used limited resource becomes expensive, alternative resources will become cheap by comparison, therefore making the alternatives economically viable options. In the long term, the theory implies faith that technological progress will allow backstop resources to be essentially unlimited (see also Cornucopian), and that need will cause the development of new technologies to become cost effective. This idea is supported by economist Robert Solow who claimed that four-fifths of US economic growth could be attributed to technological development (the other fifth being accounted for by expansion of labor and capital).

== Implications to peak oil ==
Peak Oil derives from the Hubbert peak theory, which theorizes that production of any finite resource over time will have roughly inverse curves before and after the peak of the resource's production (creating an approximately bell shaped curve). Hubbert's theory is used to predict when a resource will reach its peak of production by studying past resource discovery and production trends. Peak Oil advocates often show only crude oil production which may have set a global peak in 2005.

Backstop resource theory maintains that alternatives will be developed as they are needed.

== Historical examples ==
Cuba, during its Special Period following the collapse of the Soviet Union, increased sugar cane ethanol production to offset lost crude oil imports from the Soviet Union.

Canada is the largest single source of oil imports for the United States. As oil prices spiked following the 1979 energy crisis, Canada began significant production of oil derived from tar sands, also known as bitumen. The U.S. Department of Energy's Energy Information Administration (EIA) states that historic Canadian Tar Sand production rose from 200,000 barrels per day (32,000 m^{3}/d) in 1980 to 1,100,000 barrels per day (170,000 m^{3}/d) in 2004. EIA's 2007 International Energy Outlook estimates that tar sand production will climb to 2,300,000 bbl/d (370,000 m^{3}/d) in 2015 and 3.6 million barrels per day (570×10^{3} m^{3}/d) in 2030.

South Africa responded to anti-apartheid embargoes by switching from imported crude oil to coal liquefaction producing gasoline and diesel profitably from coal and natural gas using Fischer-Tropsch synthesis. The EIA estimates global coal-to-liquids production will climb to 600,000 bbl/d (95,000 m^{3}/d) in 2015 and 2,400,000 bbl/d (380,000 m^{3}/d) in 2030.

== Criticism ==
Environmental economists and critics of globalized capitalism take issue with this theory for a number of reasons. Environmentalists disagree with Solow's conclusion about the role of technology because it neglects to consider the increases in exploitation of natural resources which may be responsible for much of the growth attributed to technology. Anti-globalists apply a similar argument, but tend to focus on exploitation of third world societies rather than the environment.

The theory also neglects to account for certain requisite properties of the resources in question and the development of necessary infrastructure. It may be possible to design a car to run on hydrogen, but widescale construction of a hydrogen infrastructure is a far more complex problem, especially in a scenario in which the major resource is already becoming scarce.
