= Swan diagram =

In economics, a Swan Diagram, also known as the Australian model (because it was originally published by Australian economist Trevor Swan in 1956 to model the Australian economy during the Great Depression), represents the situation of a country with a currency peg.

Two lines represent a country's respective internal (employment vs. unemployment) and external (current account deficit vs. current account surplus) balance with the axes representing relative domestic costs and the country's fiscal deficit. The diagram is used to evaluate the changes to the economy that result from policies that either affect domestic expenditure or the relative demand for foreign and domestic goods.

== Mechanism ==
When there is a BOP disequilibrium, either by the market forces or policy measures for readjustments, SWAN model is helpful. Internal Balance looks forward to acquiring full employment with lowest possible inflation, whereas External Balance looks towards a "No surplus - No deficit" position in the economy.

Any point above the internal balance line (or curve) would have inflation, and any point below it would have unemployment. Similarly, any point above the external balance line (or curve) would depict a surplus, and any point below it would depict a deficit scenario.

To cure the Inflation, we would use Contractionary monetary policy which would lower it down and bring the economy to an equilibrium point. To curtail Unemployment, we would use Expansionary monetary policy which would do the same as above. In order to cure the Current account deficit in the economy, we need to increase the exports by a devaluation, that would, in turn, help in increasing the employment by creating more jobs. For Current account surplus, we would overvalue the currency so that the exports are diminished.

The zone above the equilibrium point (the V - shaped) is called the "Critical Zone" because the problem there would be very close to equilibrium. So a policy measure might just worsen the condition by taking, the economy, past the equilibrium point.
