= Labor intensity =

Labor intensity is the relative proportion of labor (compared to capital) used in any given process. Its inverse is capital intensity. Labor intensity is sometimes associated with agrarianism, while capital intensity is sometimes associated with industrialism.

Labor intensity has been declining since the onset of the Industrial Revolution in the late 1700s, while its inverse, capital intensity, has increased nearly exponentially since the latter half of the 20th century.

== Labor-intensive industries ==
A labor-intensive industry requires large amounts of manual labor to produce its goods or services. In such industries, labor costs are more of a concern than capital costs. Labor intensity is measured by its proportion to the amount of capital to produce goods or services. The higher the labor cost, the more labor intense is the business. Labor cost can vary because businesses can add or subtract workers based on business needs. When it comes to controlling expenses, labor intensive businesses have an advantage over those that are capital intensive and require a large investment in capital equipment, such as the automobile industry. When it comes to include economy of scale, labor intensive industries deal with many challenges: they cannot pay individual workers less by hiring more workers.

A labor-intensive industry can be particularly vulnerable to high inflation, because workers may demand pay increases, as the inflation lowers the value of their earnings.

Before the Industrial Revolution, the major part of the workforce was employed in agriculture. Producing food was very labor-intensive. Advances in technology have often increased worker productivity, so that some industries are less labor-intensive, but some industries, such as mining and agriculture, are still quite labor-intensive.

Some labor-intensive sectors:

- Nursing
- Textiles
- Agriculture: fruit picking is often done by hand as it is difficult for machines to pick, for example, strawberries or apples from trees.
- Teaching
- Mining
- Niche products — If a company specializes in a niche market, there will be less scope for economies of scale and lower fixed costs. In this case, we tend to see higher labor-intensive production. Pottery is an example of a niche product.

== The role in the economy ==
For underdeveloped and developing economies, a labor-intensive industry structure can be a better option than a capital-intensive one for quick economic development. For countries which are not wealthy and generate low levels of income, labor-intensive industries can bring economic growth and prosperity. In most cases, these low income countries suffer from lack of capital but have an abundant labor force, such as some African countries. The use of such an abundant labor force may lead to industrial growth.

China has a large workforce, and manufacturing industries contribute about 35 per cent to the country's gross domestic product. The country has also become one of the world's leading manufacturing bases, with leading suppliers of products such as household electric appliances, garments, toys, shoes and light industrial products.

Supply of highly skilled labor to any industry can boost the industry growth rate. In this way, underdeveloped countries can improve their industrial economy without heavy capital investment.

Moreover, exportation of the products manufactured by labor-intensive industries can strengthen the export base of a developing country. These exports help the economies by earning foreign exchange, which can be used to import essential goods and services.

== Measurement ==
There are more than one way to measure labor intensity:

- Labor-capital ratio: the relationship between employment and capital stock. This ratio indicates the relative use of factors in an activity and the extent to which it is labor-intensive compared to capital-intensive.
- The ratio between employment and value added, which indicates the labor intensity of production. This measure indicates the extent to which an activity absorbs labor for each unit of value added.

These two measures are different ways of measuring labor intensity, Neither is superior in itself, the choice of measure depends on the specific issue of interest.

However these two measures have limited value: they only measure direct labor intensity and they exclude the extent to which sectors are linked to another sector of the economy. For instance, a given sector may itself not be particularly labor-intensive, but it might utilize (as inputs) the output of other sectors that are highly labor-intensive.

A solution could be to consider employment multipliers by sector.

Employment multipliers essentially indicate what increase (decrease) in economy-wide jobs could be associated with a given increase (decrease) in final output of a sector.
