= Marginal factor cost =

Concept in microeconomics

In microeconomics, the marginal factor cost (MFC) is the increment to total costs paid for a factor of production resulting from a one-unit increase in the amount of the factor employed. It is expressed in currency units per incremental unit of a factor of production (input), such as labor, per unit of time. In the case of the labor input, for example, if the wage rate paid is unaffected by the number of units of labor hired, the marginal factor cost is identical to the wage rate. However, if hiring another unit of labor drives up the wage rate that must be paid to all existing units of labor employed, then the marginal cost of the labor factor is higher than the wage rate paid to the last unit because it also includes the increment to the rates paid to the other units.

Thus for any factor the MFC is the change in total amount paid for all units of that factor divided by the change in the quantity of that factor employed.

A firm that wants to optimize its profits hires each factor up to the point at which its marginal factor cost equals its marginal revenue product (MFC=MRP).

Marginal factor cost is an important concept in economics, as it helps to determine the optimal level of production for a good or service.
