= Edward West (economist and judge) =

Sir Edward West (1 March 1782 – 18 August 1828) was a British judge who served in India and an economist. He is known for his statement of the law of diminishing returns in his Essay on the Application of Capital to Land (1815, p. 2):

The principle is simply this, that in the progress of the improvement of cultivation the raising of rude produce becomes progressively more expensive, or, in other words, the ratio of the net produce of land to its gross produce is constantly diminishing.

Here the gross produce means the value of total output and the net is the gross minus the cost of production and exclusive of profit and rent.

== Early life ==
He was born in 1782 (baptized 5 April 1782) to John Balchen West, Receiver General for Hertfordshire. His parents died when he was still very young and Edward was brought up by his uncle, Martin Browne Ffolkes, and his wife Fanny, daughter of Sir John Turner, 3rd Baronet, at Hillington Hall near King's Lynn. Edward's sister Frances later married Captain Lane of the 47th Regiment of Foot. His grandfather Temple West was a Vice-Admiral in the Royal Navy.

West studied at Harrow School and then matriculated in 1800 at University College, Oxford, graduating B.A. in 1804 and M.A. 1807. He then became a Fellow of his college. In 1814 he was called to the Bar at the Inner Temple.

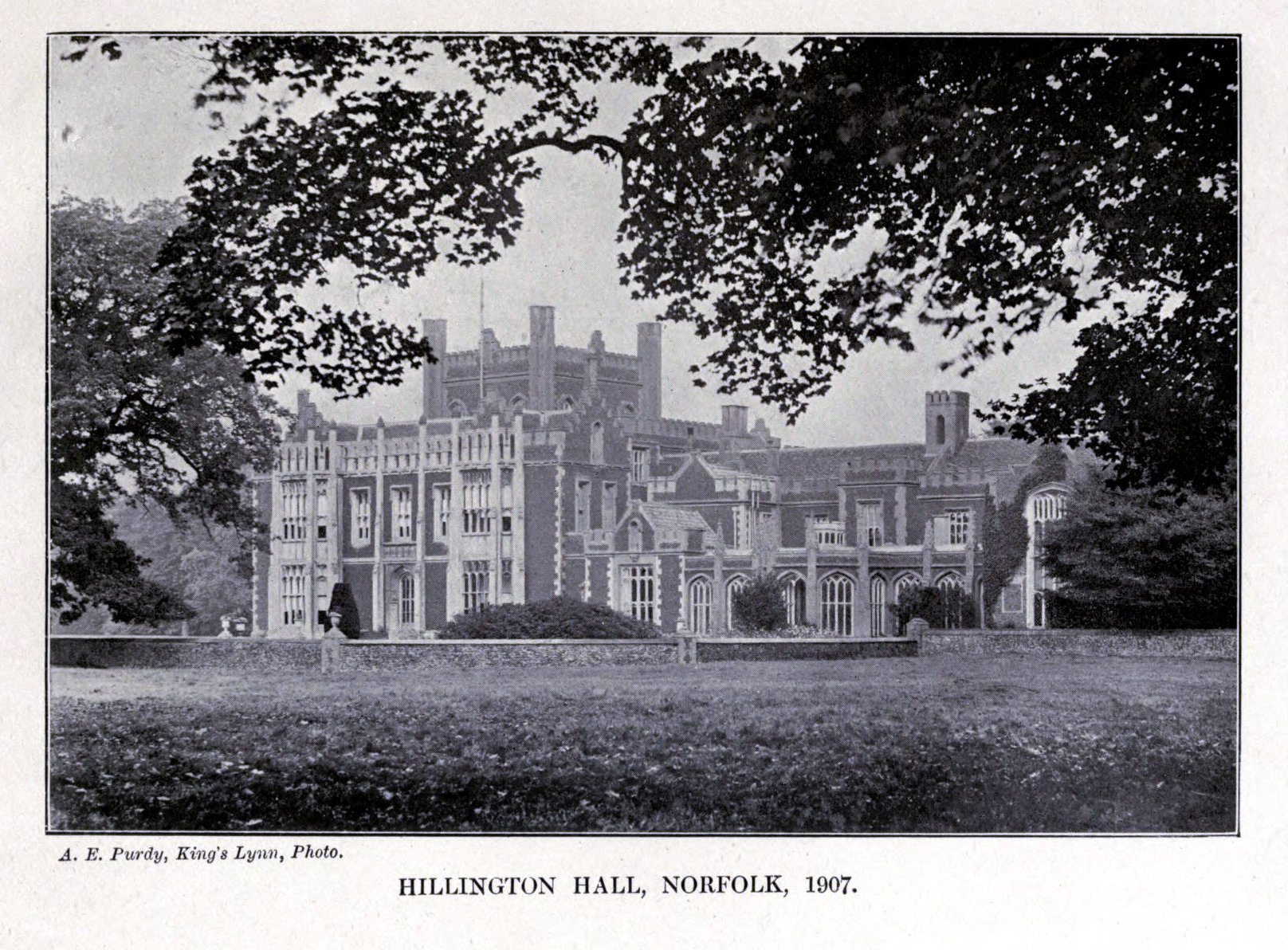
Hillingston Hall in Norfolk where West grew up

== In India ==
West was appointed Recorder of the King's Court of Bombay and knighted in the same year. He with his wife reached Bombay on 1 February 1823. He became Chief Justice on 8 May 1823. He chose to enforce order leading to being seen unfavourably by many officers in the employment of the East India Company. He suspended several barristers and dismissed some officers, notably William Erskine, Master in Equity, suspected of improbity (mostly taking bribes in cases). Mountstuart Elphinstone and some other Europeans went on the side of Erskine. Erskine's position was taken by Fenwick, a nephew of West. George Norton, a recently appointed Advocate General for Bombay introduced fees that were seven times that received in England. Norton and West clashed on this order.

== Works ==
In 1815 West wrote an essay arguing against the "impolicy of any great restriction on the importation of corn" which was appreciated by the economist David Ricardo. In 1825 he wrote a pamphlet Price of Corn and Wages of Labour in which he expressed what is now known as the law of diminishing returns. This essay was reprinted in 1903 by Johns Hopkins University with a preface by Jacob Hollander.

== Death ==
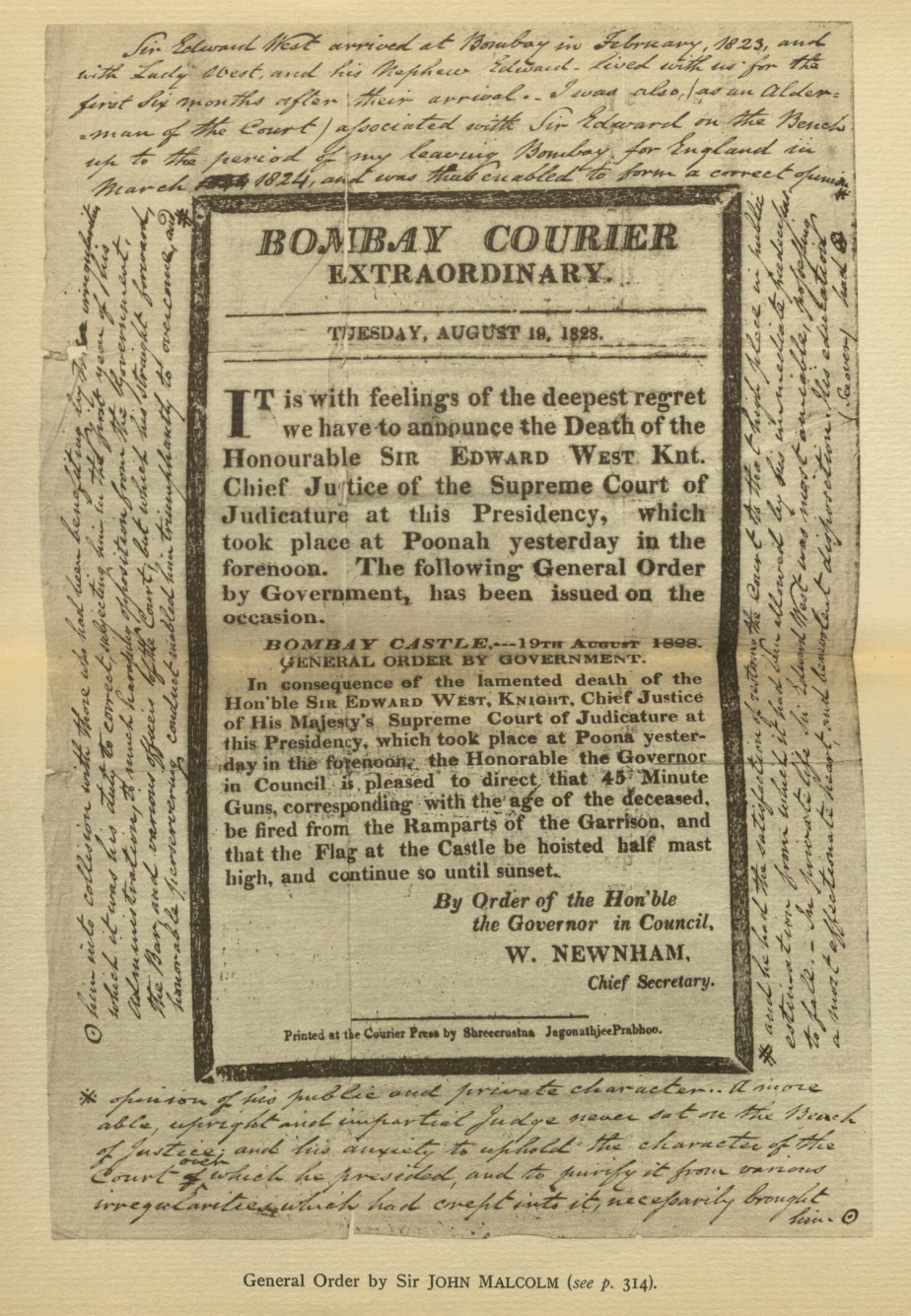
Notice upon the death of West issued by Sir John Malcolm

Edward West died at Poona where he was buried. A scholarship was started in Bombay by the citizens in his honour.

== Family ==
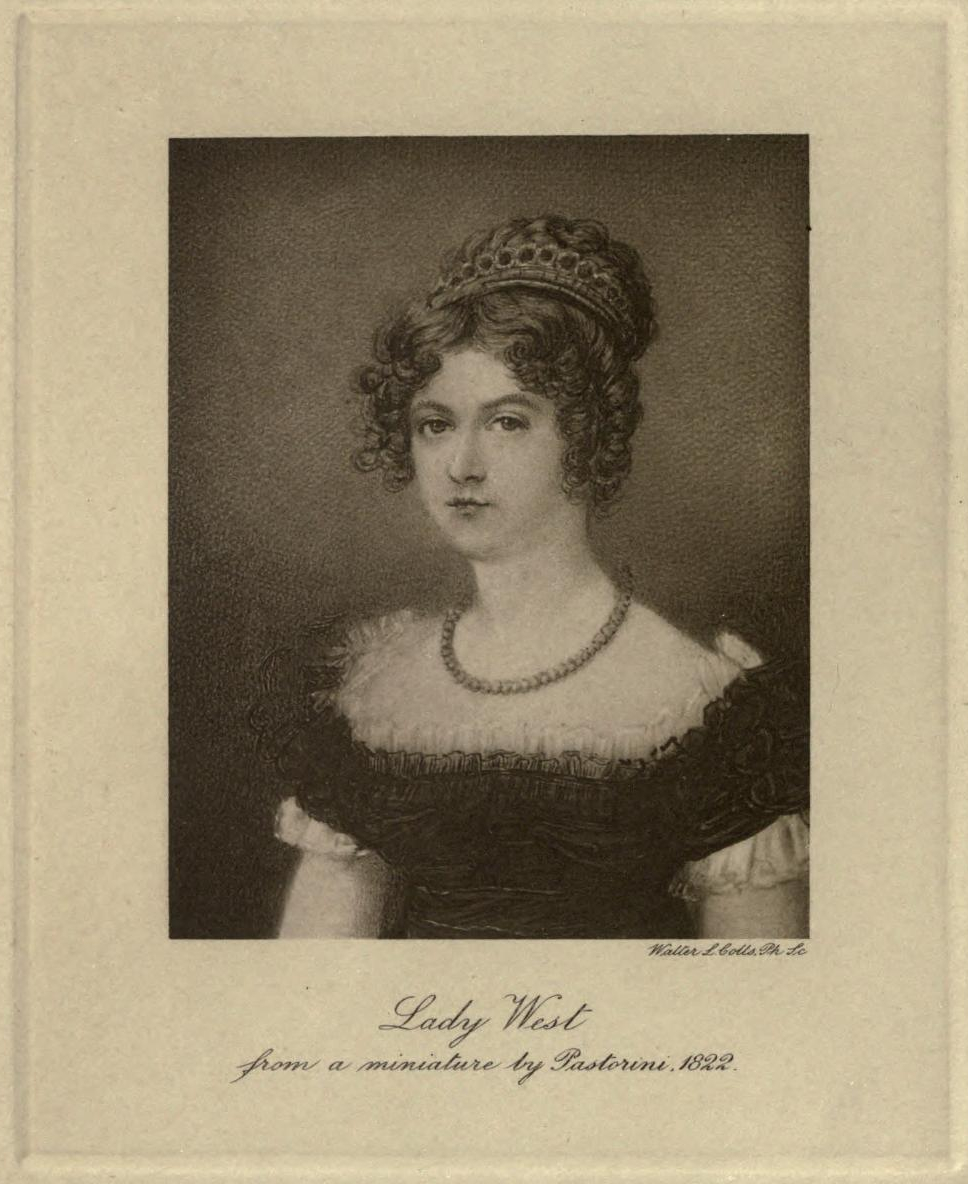
Lady West

Edward West married Lucretia Ffolkes, daughter of his guardian uncle, on 26 August 1822 at Marylebone Church. She came from a political family, and earlier in the year had been campaigning for her brother Sir William ffolkes, 2nd Baronet, after the death of their father had caused a by-election.

The couple had a daughter Fanny Anna in 1826. Lucretia died during the birth of her second child (the infant son also died) in 1828, shortly after the death of her husband. Fanny Anna West was brought up in England, at Hillington Hall, King's Lynn.
