= Factors of production =

Resources used in the production process

In economics, factors of production, resources, or inputs are what is used in the production process to produce output—that is, goods and services. The utilised amounts of the various inputs determine the quantity of output according to the relationship called the production function. There are four basic resources or factors of production: land, labour, capital and entrepreneur (or enterprise). The factors are also frequently labeled "producer goods or services" to distinguish them from the goods or services purchased by consumers, which are frequently labeled "consumer goods".

There are two types of factors: primary and secondary. The previously mentioned primary factors are land, labour and capital. Materials and energy are considered secondary factors in classical economics because they are obtained from land, labour, and capital. The primary factors facilitate production but neither become part of the product (as with raw materials) nor become significantly transformed by the production process (as with fuel used to power machinery). Land includes not only the site of production but also natural resources above or below the soil. Recent usage has distinguished human capital (the stock of knowledge in the labor force) from labour. Entrepreneurship is also sometimes considered a factor of production. Sometimes the overall state of technology is described as a factor of production. The number and definition of factors vary, depending on theoretical purpose, empirical emphasis, or school of economics.

== Historical schools and factors ==
In the interpretation of the currently dominant view and of a classical economic theory developed by neoclassical economists, the term "factors" did not exist until after the classical period and is not to be found in any of the literature of that time.

Differences are most stark when it comes to deciding which factor is the most important.

=== Physiocracy ===
Physiocracy (from the Greek for "government of nature") is an economic theory developed by a group of 18th century Enlightenment French economists who believed that the wealth of nations was derived solely from the value of "land agriculture" or "land development" and that agricultural products should be highly priced.

=== Classical ===
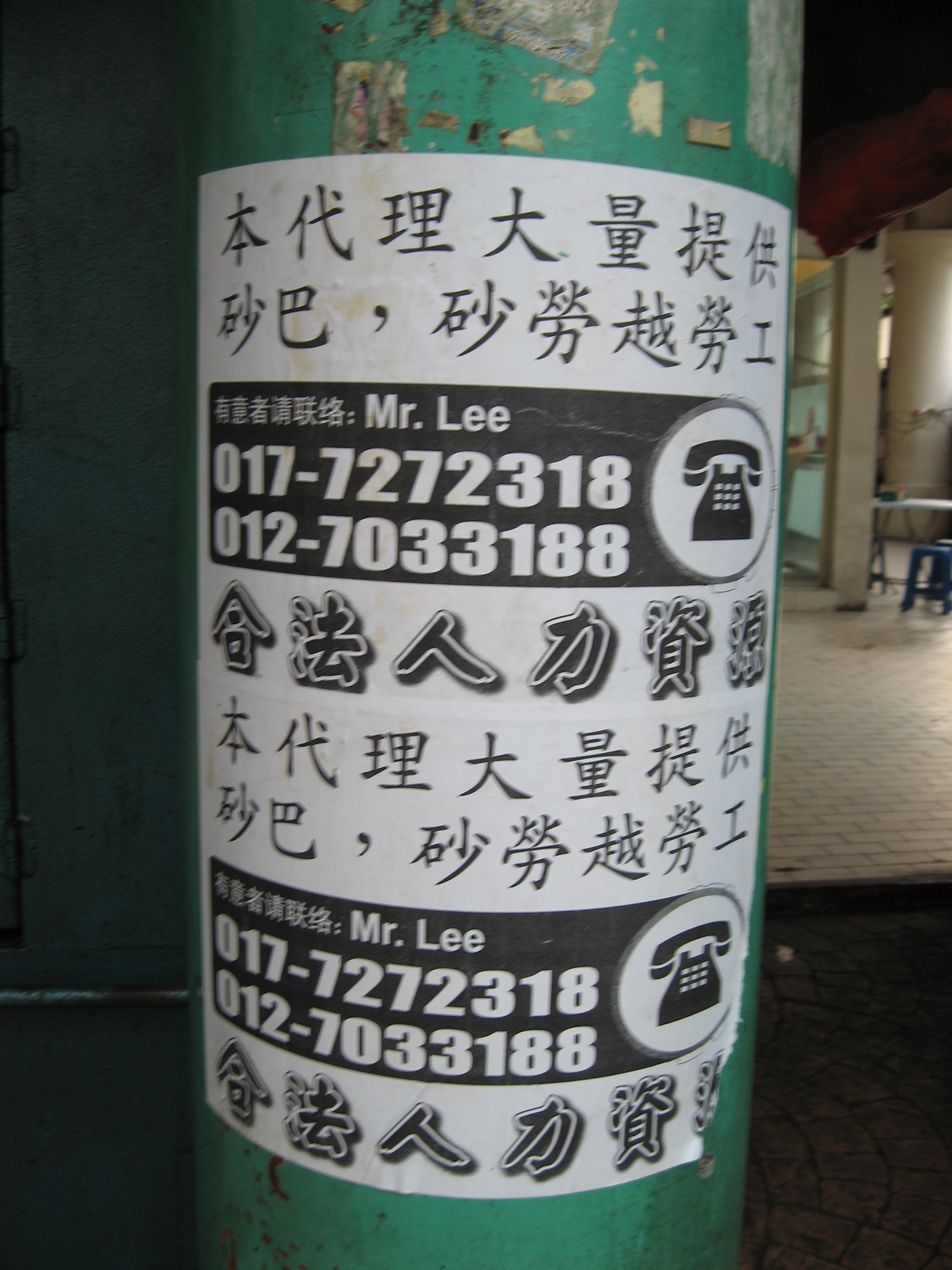
An advertisement for labor from Sabah and Sarawak seen in Jalan Petaling, Kuala Lumpur

The classical economics of Adam Smith, David Ricardo, and their followers focus on physical resources in defining its factors of production and discuss the distribution of cost and value among these factors. Adam Smith and David Ricardo referred to the "component parts of price" as the costs of using:

- Land or natural resource — naturally occurring goods like water, air, soil, minerals, flora, fauna and climate that are used in the creation of products. The payment given to a landowner is rent, loyalties, commission and goodwill.
- Labor — human effort used in production which also includes technical and marketing expertise. The payment for someone else's labor and all income received from one's own labor is wages. Labor can also be classified as the physical and mental contribution of an employee to the production of the good(s).
- Capital stock — human-made goods which are used in the production of other goods. These include machinery, tools, and buildings. They are of two types, fixed and working. Fixed are one time investments like machines, tools and working consists of liquid cash or money in hand and raw material.

The classical economists also employed the word "capital" in reference to money. Money, however, was not considered to be a factor of production in the sense of capital stock since it is not used to directly produce any good. The return to loaned money or to loaned stock was styled as interest while the return to the actual proprietor of capital stock (tools, etc.) was styled as profit. See also returns.

=== Marxism ===
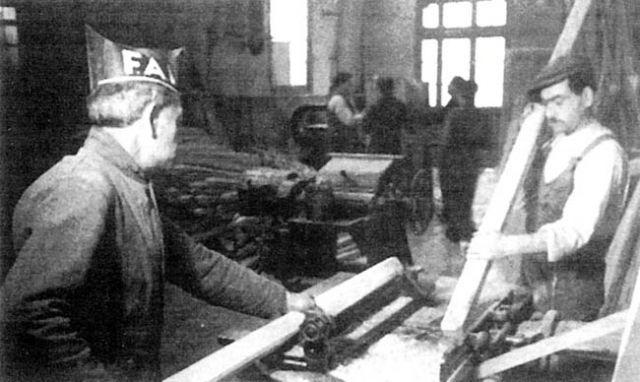
CNT-FAI worker cooperative in Barcelona producing wood and steel products

Marx considered the "elementary factors of the labor-process" or "productive forces" to be:

- Labor
- Subject of labor (objects transformed by labor)
- Instruments of labor (or means of labor).

The "subject of labor" refers to natural resources and raw materials, including land. The "instruments of labor" are tools, in the broadest sense. They include factory buildings, infrastructure, and other human-made objects that facilitate labor's production of goods and services.

This view seems similar to the classical perspective described above. But unlike the classical school and many economists today, Marx made a clear distinction between labor actually done and an individual's "labor power" or ability to work. Labor done is often referred to nowadays as "effort" or "labor services". Labor-power might be seen as a stock which can produce a flow of labor.

Labor, not labor power, is the key factor of production for Marx and the basis for earlier economists' labor theory of value. The hiring of labor power only results in the production of goods or services ("use-values") when organized and regulated (often by the "management"). How much labor is actually done depends on the importance of conflict or tensions within the labor process.

=== Neoclassical economics ===
Neoclassical economics, one of the branches of mainstream economics, started with the classical factors of production of land, labor, and capital. However, it developed an alternative theory of value and distribution. Many of its practitioners have added various further factors of production (see below).

Further distinctions from classical and neoclassical microeconomics include the following:

- Capital — this has many meanings, including the financial capital raised to operate and expand a business. In much of economics, however, "capital" (without any qualification) means goods that can help produce other goods in the future, the result of investment. It refers to machines, roads, factories, schools, infrastructure, and office buildings which humans have produced to create goods and services.
- Fixed capital — this includes machinery, factories, equipment, new technology, buildings, computers, and other goods that are designed to increase the productive potential of the economy for future years. Nowadays, many consider computer software to be a form of fixed capital and it is counted as such in the National Income and Product Accounts of the United States and other countries. This type of capital does not change due to the production of the good.
- Working capital — this includes the stocks of finished and semi-finished goods that will be economically consumed in the near future or will be made into a finished consumer good in the near future. These are often called inventory. The phrase "working capital" has also been used to refer to liquid assets (money) needed for immediate expenses linked to the production process (to pay salaries, invoices, taxes, interests...) Either way, the amount or nature of this type of capital usually changes during the production process.
- Financial capital — this is simply the amount of money the initiator of the business has invested in it. "Financial capital" often refers to his or her net worth tied up in the business (assets minus liabilities) but the phrase often includes money borrowed from others.
- Technological progress — For over a century, economists have known that capital and labor do not account for all economic growth. To include the technological progress into the theory, it was proposed to introduce capital service and labour service as production factors in line with capital and labour. This is reflected in total factor productivity and the Solow residual used in economic models called production functions that account for the contributions of capital and labor, yet have some unexplained contributor which is commonly called technological progress.

=== Ecological economics ===
Ecological economics is an alternative to neoclassical economics. It integrates, among other things, the first and second laws of thermodynamics to formulate more realistic economic systems that adhere to fundamental physical limitations. In addition to the neoclassical focus on efficient allocation, ecological economics emphasizes sustainability of scale and just distribution. Ecological economics also differ from neoclassical theories in its definitions of factors of production, replacing them with the following:

- Matter — the material from which products are produced. Matter can be recycled or reused through refining or reforming, but it cannot be created or destroyed, placing an upper limit on the amount of material that can be withdrawn and used. Consequently, the total amount of available matter is fixed, and once all the available matter is used, nothing more can be produced without recycling or reusing matter from prior products.
- Energy — the physical but non-material inputs of production. We can place different forms of energy on a scale of utility depending on how useful it is for creating a product. Due to the law of entropy, energy tends to decrease in utility over time. (e.g. electricity, a very useful form of energy, is used to run a machine that builds a stuffed bear. In the process, however, electricity is converted to heat, a less useful form of energy). Like matter, energy can neither be created nor destroyed and thus there is also an upper limit to the total amount usable energy.
- Design intelligence — a factor that incorporates the knowledge, creativity, and efficiency of how goods are created - the better the design, the more efficient and beneficial the creation is. Designs are usually improvements on their predecessors since our store of accumulated knowledge grows with time. One possible neoclassical analogue of design intelligence is technological progress.

Integral to ecological economics is the following notion: at the maximum rates of sustainable matter and energy uptake, the only way to increase productivity would be through an increase in design intelligence. This provides the basis for a core tenet of ecological economics, namely that infinite growth is impossible.

== Fourth factor ==
In the first half of the 20th century, some authors added the work of organization or entrepreneurship as a fourth factor of production. This became standard in the post-war Neoclassical synthesis. For example, J. B. Clark saw the co-ordinating function in production and distribution as being served by entrepreneurs; Frank Knight introduced managers who co-ordinate using their own money (financial capital) and the financial capital of others. In contrast, many economists today consider "human capital" (skills and education) as the fourth factor of production, with entrepreneurship as a form of human capital. Yet others refer to intellectual capital. More recently, many have begun to see "social capital" as a factor, as contributing to production of goods and services.

=== Entrepreneurship ===
In markets, entrepreneurs combine the other factors of production, land, labor, and capital, to make a profit. Often these entrepreneurs are seen as innovators, developing new ways to produce new products. In a planned economy, central planners decide how land, labor, and capital should be used to provide for maximum benefit for all citizens. Just as with market entrepreneurs, the benefits may mostly accrue to the entrepreneurs themselves.

The sociologist C. Wright Mills refers to "new entrepreneurs" who work within and between corporate and government bureaucracies in new and different ways. Others (such as those practicing public choice theory) refer to "political entrepreneurs", i.e., politicians and other actors.

Much controversy rages about the benefits produced by entrepreneurship. But the real issue is about how well institutions they operate in (markets, planning, bureaucracies, government) serve the public. This concerns such issues as the relative importance of market failure and government failure.

In the book Accounting of Ideas, "intequity", a neologism, is abstracted from equity to add a newly researched production factor of the capitalist system. Equity, which is regarded as part of capital, was divided into equity and intequity. Intequity means capital of ideas. Entrepreneurship was divided into network-related matters and creating-related matters. Network-related matters function in the sphere of equity, and creating-related matters in spheres of intequities.

=== Natural resources ===
Robert Ayres and Benjamin Warr are among the economists who criticize orthodox economics for overlooking the role of natural resources and the effects of declining resource capital.

=== Energy ===
Reiner Kümmel worked on the evaluation of energy, or more precisely exergy, as a production factor. He showed it can be seen as individual factor of production, with an elasticity larger than labor. A cointegration analysis support results derived from linear exponential (LINEX) production functions. The work of Ayres shows similar results.

=== Cultural heritage ===
C. H. Douglas disagreed with classical economists who recognized only three factors of production. While Douglas did not deny the role of these factors in production, he considered the "Cultural heritage" as the primary factor. He defined cultural inheritance as the knowledge, techniques, and processes that have accrued to us incrementally from the origins of civilization (i.e., progress). Consequently, mankind does not have to keep "reinventing the wheel". "We are merely the administrators of that cultural inheritance, and to that extent, the cultural inheritance is the property of all of us, without exception. Adam Smith, David Ricardo, and Karl Marx claimed that labor creates all value. While Douglas did not deny that all costs ultimately relate to labour charges of some sort (past or present), he denied that the present labour of the world creates all wealth. Douglas carefully distinguished between value, costs and prices. He claimed that one of the factors resulting in a misdirection of thought in terms of the nature and function of money was economists' near-obsession about values and their relation to prices and incomes. While Douglas recognized "value in use" as a legitimate theory of values, he also considered values as subjective and not capable of being measured in an objective manner.

Peter Kropotkin argued for the common ownership of all intellectual and useful property due to the collective work that went into creating it. Kropotkin does not argue that the product of a worker's labor should belong to the worker. Instead, Kropotkin asserts that every individual product is essentially the work of everyone since every individual relies on the intellectual and physical labor of those who came before them as well as those who built the world around them. Because of this, Kropotkin proclaims that every human deserves an essential right to well-being because every human contributes to the collective social product: Kropotkin goes on to say that the central obstacle preventing humanity from claiming this right is the state's violent protection of private property. Kropotkin compares this relationship to feudalism, saying that even if the forms have changed, the essential relationship between the propertied and the landless is the same as the relationship between a feudal lord and their serfs.

== See also ==
- Conditional factor demands
- Cost of production theory of value
- Diminishing returns
- Economic inequality
- Economics terminology that differs from common usage
- Factor market
- Factor world
- Labor demand
- Labor theory of value
- Labour economics
- Marginal factor cost
- Means of production
- Microeconomics
- Pareto principle
- Production relations
- Production theory basics
- Productivity model
- Productivity world
- Resource-Based View
- Social metabolism
