= Capital deepening =

Situation where the capital per worker is increasing in the economy

Capital deepening is a situation where the capital per worker is increasing in the economy. This is also referred to as increase in the capital intensity. Capital deepening is often measured by the rate of change in capital stock per labour hour. Overall, the economy will expand, and productivity per worker will increase. However, according to some economic models, such as the Solow model, economic expansion will not continue indefinitely through capital deepening alone. This is partly due to diminishing returns and wear & tear (depreciation). Investment is also required to increase the amount of capital available to each worker in the system and thus increase the ratio of capital to labour. In other economic models, for example, the AK model or some models in endogenous growth theory, capital deepening can lead to sustained economic growth even without technological progress. Traditionally, in development economics, capital deepening is seen as a necessary but not sufficient condition for economic development of a country.

Capital widening is the situation where the stock of capital is increasing at the same rate as the labour force and the depreciation rate, thus the capital per worker ratio remains constant. The economy will expand in terms of aggregate output, but productivity per worker will remain constant.

== See also ==
- Capital (economics)
- Capital intensity
- Organic composition of capital
- Structural unemployment
