= Robert Solow =

American economist and Nobel Laureate (1924–2023)

Robert Solow GCIH
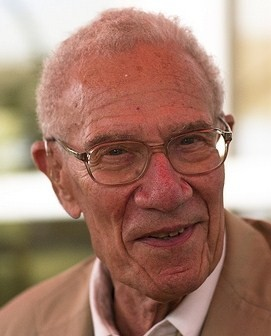
- Solow in 2008
- Born: Robert Merton Solow; August 23, 1924; Brooklyn, New York, U.S.
- Died: December 21, 2023 (aged 99); Lexington, Massachusetts, U.S.

Academic background
- Education: Harvard University (AB, AM, PhD); Columbia University
- Doctoral advisor: Wassily Leontief
- Influences: Paul Samuelson

Academic work
- Discipline: Macroeconomics
- School or tradition: Neo-Keynesian economics
- Institutions: Massachusetts Institute of Technology
- Doctoral students: George Akerlof; Mario Baldassarri; Francis M. Bator; Charlie Bean; Alan Blinder; Vittorio Corbo; Peter Diamond; Avinash Dixit; Mario Draghi; Alain Enthoven; Ray Fair; Ronald Findlay; Robert J. Gordon; Robert Hall; Michael Intriligator; Katsuhito Iwai; Ronald W. Jones; Arnold Kling; Meir Kohn; Glenn Loury; Herbert Mohring; William Nordhaus; George Perry; Robert Pindyck; Arjun Kumar Sengupta; Steven Shavell; Eytan Sheshinski; Jeremy Siegel; Joseph Stiglitz; Harvey M. Wagner; Martin Weitzman; Halbert White
- Notable ideas: Solow–Swan model
- Awards: John Bates Clark Medal (1961); Nobel Memorial Prize in Economic Sciences (1987); National Medal of Science (1999); Presidential Medal of Freedom (2014)
- Website: Information at IDEAS / RePEc

Robert Merton Solow (/ˈsoʊloʊ/; August 23, 1924 – December 21, 2023) was an American economist known for his studies of economic growth and the development of the Solow–Swan model, for which he won the 1987 Nobel Memorial Prize in Economic Sciences.

He was Institute Professor Emeritus of Economics at the Massachusetts Institute of Technology, where he was a professor from 1949 on. He was awarded the John Bates Clark Medal in 1961, the Nobel Memorial Prize in Economic Sciences in 1987, and the Presidential Medal of Freedom in 2014. Five of his PhD students, George Akerlof, Joseph Stiglitz, Peter Diamond, William Nordhaus and Robert Hall, later received Nobel Memorial Prizes in Economic Sciences in their own right.

== Biography ==
Robert Solow was born in Brooklyn, New York, into a Jewish family on August 23, 1924, the oldest of three children. He attended local public school and excelled academically early in life. In September 1940, Solow went to Harvard College with a scholarship at the age of 16. At Harvard, his first studies were in sociology and anthropology as well as elementary economics.

In 1942, Solow left the university and joined the U.S. Army where he served in the Signal Corps. Because he was fluent in German, the Army put him on a task force whose primary purpose was to intercept, interpret, and send back German messages to base. He served briefly in North Africa and Sicily, and later in Italy until he was discharged in August 1945. Shortly after returning, he proceeded to marry his girlfriend, Barbara Lewis (died 2014), whom he had been dating for six weeks.

Solow returned to Harvard in 1945 and studied under Wassily Leontief, serving as his research assistant and producing the first set of capital-coefficients for the input–output model, an early contribution to computational economic analysis. This work introduced him to linear modeling and quantitative analysis, which influenced his subsequent interests in statistics and probability. From 1949 to 1950, he spent a fellowship year at Columbia University to study statistics more intensively while completing his Ph.D. thesis, an exploratory examination of changes in the wage-income distribution using interacting Markov processes for employment, unemployment, and wage dynamics. Although the dissertation won Harvard’s Wells Prize, Solow opted not to publish it. These early analytical projects formed the methodological foundation for his later contributions to macroeconomics, including the development of the Solow–Swan growth model and his empirical work on productivity and technical change.

In 1949, just before going off to Columbia, he was offered and accepted an assistant professorship in the Economics Department at Massachusetts Institute of Technology. At MIT he taught courses in statistics and econometrics. Solow's interest gradually changed to macroeconomics. For almost 40 years, Solow and Paul Samuelson worked together on many landmark theories: von Neumann growth theory (1953), theory of capital (1956), linear programming (1958) and the Phillips curve (1960), a key insight for contemporary macroeconomic research.

Solow also held several government positions, including senior economist for the Council of Economic Advisers (1961–62) and member of the President's Commission on Income Maintenance (1968–70). His studies focused mainly in the fields of employment and growth policies, and the theory of capital.

In 1961 he won the American Economic Association's John Bates Clark Award, given to the best economist under age forty; in 1979 he served as president of that association. In 1964, he served as the president of the Econometric Society. In 1974, Solow helped found the Manpower Demonstration Research Corporation (MDRC), a trailblazing organization in randomized evaluations of labor market programs. In 1987, he won the Nobel Prize for his analysis of economic growth and in 1999, he received the National Medal of Science. In 2011, he received an honorary degree in Doctor of Science from Tufts University.

Solow was interviewed for a 1994 on journal rejections by leading economists where he noted that he had never had a journal article rejected. He added, "Probably this is because I hate writing articles."

Solow was the founder of the Cournot Foundation and the Cournot Centre. After the death of his colleague Franco Modigliani, Solow accepted an appointment as new Chairman of the I.S.E.O Institute, an Italian nonprofit cultural association which organizes international conferences and summer schools. He was a founding trustee of the Economists for Peace and Security.

Solow's students include Nobel Prize winners Peter Diamond, George Akerlof, Joseph Stiglitz, and William Nordhaus, as well as Michael Rothschild, Halbert White, Charlie Bean, Michael Woodford, and Harvey Wagner.

Solow was one of the signees of a 2018 amicus curiae brief that expressed support for Harvard University in the Students for Fair Admissions v. President and Fellows of Harvard College lawsuit. Signers of the brief include Alan B. Krueger, George A. Akerlof, Janet Yellen, and Cecilia Rouse.

Solow was one of the supporters of Joe Biden's Inflation Reduction Act of 2022.

Solow died at his home in Lexington, Massachusetts, on December 21, 2023, at the age of 99.

== Model of economic growth ==
Solow's model of economic growth, often known as the Solow–Swan neoclassical growth model as the model was independently discovered by Trevor W. Swan and published in "The Economic Record" in 1956, allows the determinants of economic growth to be separated into increases in inputs (labour and capital) and technical progress. The reason these models are called "exogenous" growth models is the saving rate is taken to be exogenously given. Subsequent work derives savings behavior from an inter-temporal utility-maximizing framework. Using his model, Solow (1957) calculated that about four-fifths of the growth in US output per worker was attributable to technical progress.

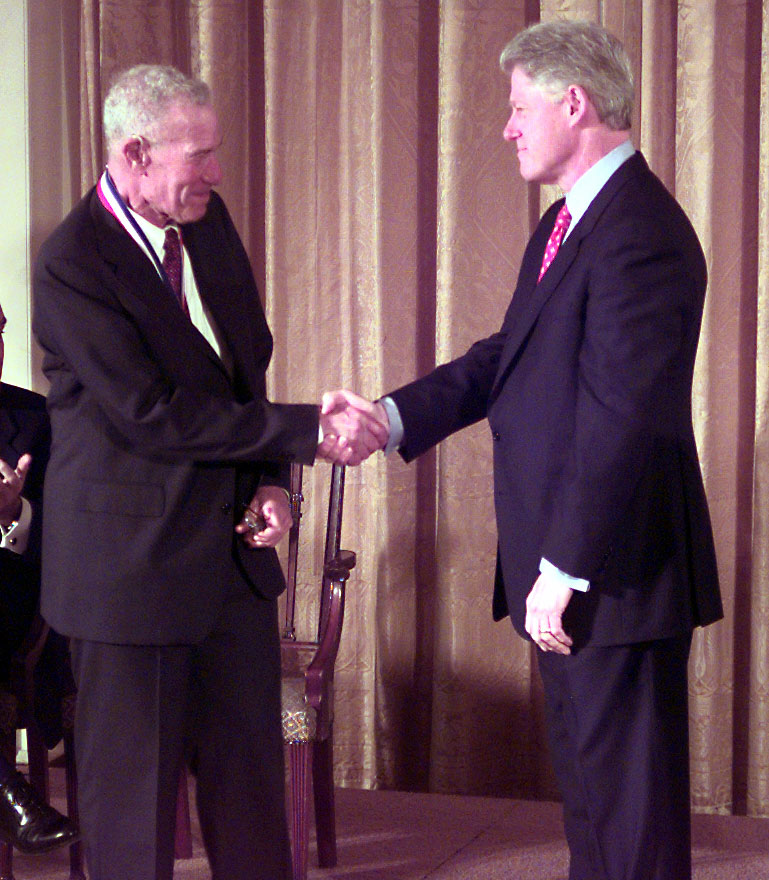
Bill Clinton awarding Solow the National Medal of Science in 1999

Solow also was the first to develop a growth model with different vintages of capital. The idea behind Solow's vintage capital growth model is that new capital is more valuable than old (vintage) capital because new capital is produced through known technology. He first states that capital must be a finite entity because all of the resources on the earth are indeed limited. Within the confines of Solow's model, this known technology is assumed to be constantly improving. Consequently, the products of this technology (the new capital) are expected to be more productive as well as more valuable.

The idea lay dormant for some time perhaps because Dale W. Jorgenson (1966) argued that it was observationally equivalent with disembodied technological progress, as advanced earlier in Solow (1957). It was successfully advanced in subsequent research by Jeremy Greenwood, Zvi Hercowitz and Per Krusell (1997), who argued that the secular decline in capital goods prices could be used to measure embodied technological progress. They labeled the notion investment-specific technological progress. Solow (2001) approved. Both Paul Romer and Robert Lucas, Jr. subsequently developed alternatives to Solow's neoclassical growth model.

To better communicate the meaning behind his work, Solow used a graphical design to illustrate his concepts. On the x-axis he puts capital per worker and for the y-axis he uses output per worker. The reason for graphing capital and output per worker is due to his assumption that the nation is at full employment. The first (top) curve represents the output produced at each given level of capital. The second (middle) curve shows the depreciating nature of capital which remains constantly positive. The third curve (bottom) conveys savings/investment per worker. As the old machinery wears down and breaks, new capital goods must be bought to replace the old. The point where the two lines meet is known as the steady state level, which means that the nation is producing just enough to be able to replace the old capital. Countries that are closer to the steady state level, on the left side, grow more slowly when compared to countries closer to the vertex of the graph. When countries are to the right of the steady state level, they are not growing because all the returns they create need to go to replacing and repairing their old capital.

Since Solow's initial work in the 1950s, many more sophisticated models of economic growth have been proposed, leading to varying conclusions about the causes of economic growth. For example, rather than assuming, as Solow did, that people save at a given constant rate, subsequent work applied a consumer-optimization framework to derive savings behavior endogenously, allowing saving rates to vary at different points in time, depending on income flows, for example. In the 1980s efforts have focused on the role of technological progress in the economy, leading to the development of endogenous growth theory (or new growth theory). Today, economists use Solow's sources-of-growth accounting to estimate the separate effects on economic growth of technological change, capital, and labor.

In 2022, Solow was still an emeritus Institute Professor in the MIT economics department.

== Honors ==
- Grand-Cross of the Order of Prince Henry, Portugal (September 27, 2006)
- Member, American Academy of Arts and Sciences (1956)
- Member, United States National Academy of Sciences (1972)
- Member, American Philosophical Society (1980)

== Publications ==
=== Books ===
- Dorfman, Robert; Samuelson, Paul; Solow, Robert M. (1958). Linear programming and economic analysis. New York: McGraw-Hill.
- Solow, Robert M. (2006) [1970]. Growth Theory: An Exposition (2nd ed.). Oxford University Press. ISBN 978-0195012958.
- Dertouzos, Michael; Lester, Richard; Solow, Robert M. (1989). Made in America: Regaining the Productive Edge. New York: HarperPerennial.
- Solow, Robert M. (1990). The Labor Market as a Social Institution. Blackwell. ISBN 978-1557860866.

=== Book chapters ===
- Solow, Robert M. (1960), "Investment and technical progress", in Arrow, Kenneth J.; Karlin, Samuel; Suppes, Patrick (eds.), Mathematical models in the social sciences, 1959: Proceedings of the first Stanford symposium, Stanford mathematical studies in the social sciences, IV, Stanford, California: Stanford University Press, pp. 89–104. ISBN 978-0804700214
- Solow, Robert M. (2001), "After technical progress and the aggregate production function", in Hulten, Charles R.; Dean, Edwin R.; Harper, Michael J. (eds.), New developments in productivity analysis, Chicago, Illinois: University of Chicago Press, pp. 173–78, ISBN 978-0226360645.
- Solow, Robert M. (2009), "Imposed environmental standards and international trade", in Kanbur, Ravi; Basu, Kaushik (eds.), Arguments for a better world: essays in honor of Amartya Sen | Volume II: Society, institutions and development, Oxford New York: Oxford University Press, pp. 411–24, ISBN 978-0199239979.

=== Journal articles ===
- Robert Merton Solow (January 1952). "On the Structure of Linear Models". Econometrica. 20 (1): 29–46. doi:10.2307/1907805. JSTOR 1907805.
- Solow, Robert M. (1955). "The Production Function and the Theory of Capital". The Review of Economic Studies: 103–07.
- Solow, Robert M. (February 1956). "A contribution to the theory of economic growth" (PDF). Quarterly Journal of Economics. 70 (1): 65–94. doi:10.2307/1884513. hdl:10338.dmlcz/143862. JSTOR 1884513.
- Solow, Robert M. (1957). "Technical change and the aggregate production function". Review of Economics and Statistics. 39 (3): 312–20. doi:10.2307/1926047. JSTOR 1926047. S2CID 153438644. Pdf.
- Solow, Robert M. (May 1974). "The economics of resources or the resources of economics". The American Economic Review: Papers and Proceedings. 64 (2): 1–14. JSTOR 1816009.
- Solow, Robert M. (September 1997). "Georgescu-Roegen versus Solow/Stiglitz". Ecological Economics. 22 (3): 267–68. Bibcode:1997EcoEc..22..267S. doi:10.1016/S0921-8009(97)00081-5.

See also: Nicholas Georgescu-Roegen and Joseph Stiglitz.

- Solow, Robert M. (November 2003). "Lessons learned from U.S. welfare reform". Prisme. 2. Archived from the original on May 16, 2015.
- Solow, Robert M. (Spring 2007). "The last 50 years in growth theory and the next 10". Oxford Review of Economic Policy. 23 (1): 3–14. doi:10.1093/oxrep/grm004.

== See also ==
- List of economists
- List of Jewish Nobel laureates
- Backstop resources
- Solow residual

== Sources ==
- Greenwood, Jeremy; Krusell, Per; Hercowitz, Zvi (1997). "Long-run Implications of Investment-Specific Technological Progress". American Economic Review. 87: 343–62.
- Greenwood, Jeremy; Krusell, Per (2007). "Growth Accounting with Investment-Specific Technological Progress: A Discussion of Two Approaches". Journal of Monetary Economics. 54 (4): 1300–10. doi:10.1016/j.jmoneco.2006.02.008.
- Jorgenson, Dale W. (1966). "The Embodiment Hypothesis". Journal of Political Economy. 74: 1–17. doi:10.1086/259105. S2CID 154389143.

Awards
Preceded by James M. Buchanan Jr.	Laureate of the Nobel Memorial Prize in Economics; 1987	Succeeded by Maurice Allais
