= Total revenue =

Total receipts a seller can obtain

Total revenue is the total receipts a seller can obtain from selling goods or services to buyers. It can be written as P × Q, which is the price of the goods multiplied by the quantity of the sold goods.

== Perfect competitor ==
A perfectly competitive firm faces a demand curve that is infinitely elastic. That is, there is exactly one price that it can sell at – the market price. At any lower price it could get more revenue by selling the same amount at the market price, while at any higher price no one would buy any quantity. Total revenue equals the market price times the quantity the firm chooses to produce and sell.

== Monopoly ==
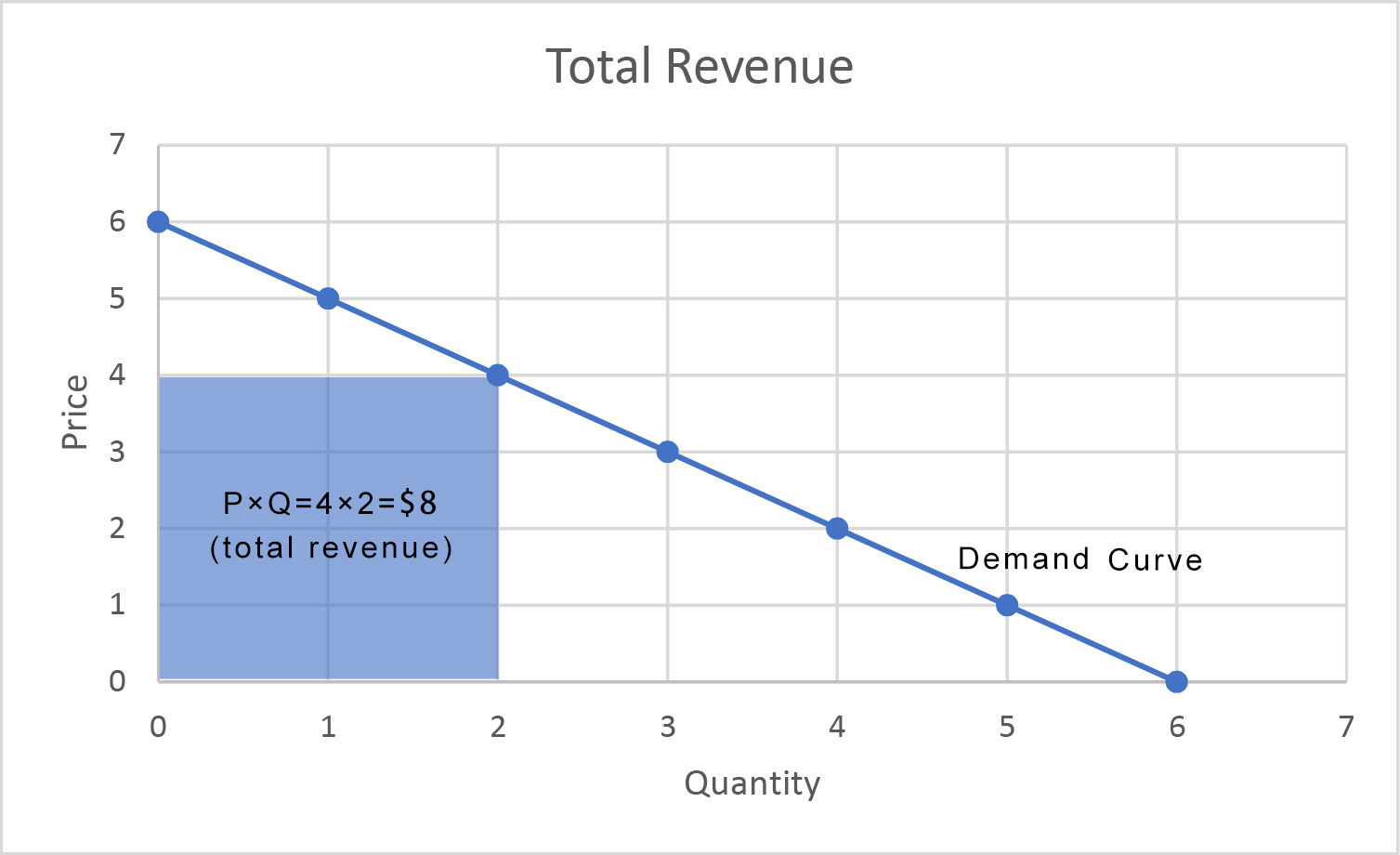

Figure 1. A linear demand curve (top) and resulting total revenue curve (bottom)

As with a perfect competitor, a monopolist’s total revenue is the total receipts it can obtain from selling goods or services to buyers. It can be written as $P\times Q$, which is the price of the goods multiplied by the quantity of the sold goods. A monopolist's total revenue can be graphed as in Figure 1, in which Price (P) is the height of the box, and Quantity (Q) is the width. $P \times Q$, (i.e., total revenue) equals the area of the box. Letting TR be the total revenue function: $\mathit{TR}(Q) = P(Q) \times Q$, where Q is the quantity of output sold, and P(Q) is the inverse demand function (the demand function solved out for price in terms of quantity demanded). Continuing to use Figure 1 as an example, price can be written as a function of quantity: $P = - Q + 6$, and be substituted into TR(Q) to get the TR function $\mathit{TR}= - Q^2 + 6Q$, which is a quadratic. In Figures 2 through 4, this function is shown graphically by using an example of demand for apples. The quantity of apples demanded drops as the price increases, which leads to the changes of the total revenue.

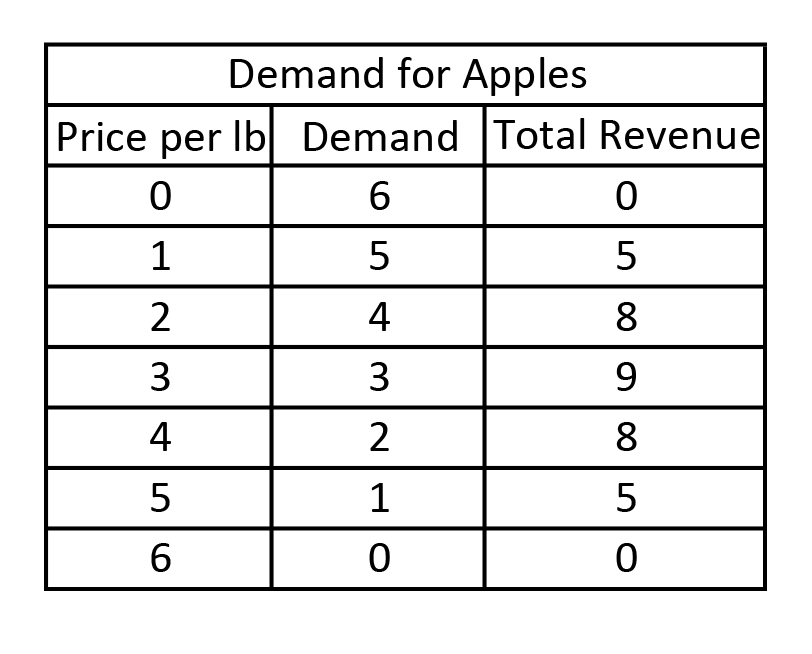
Figure 2

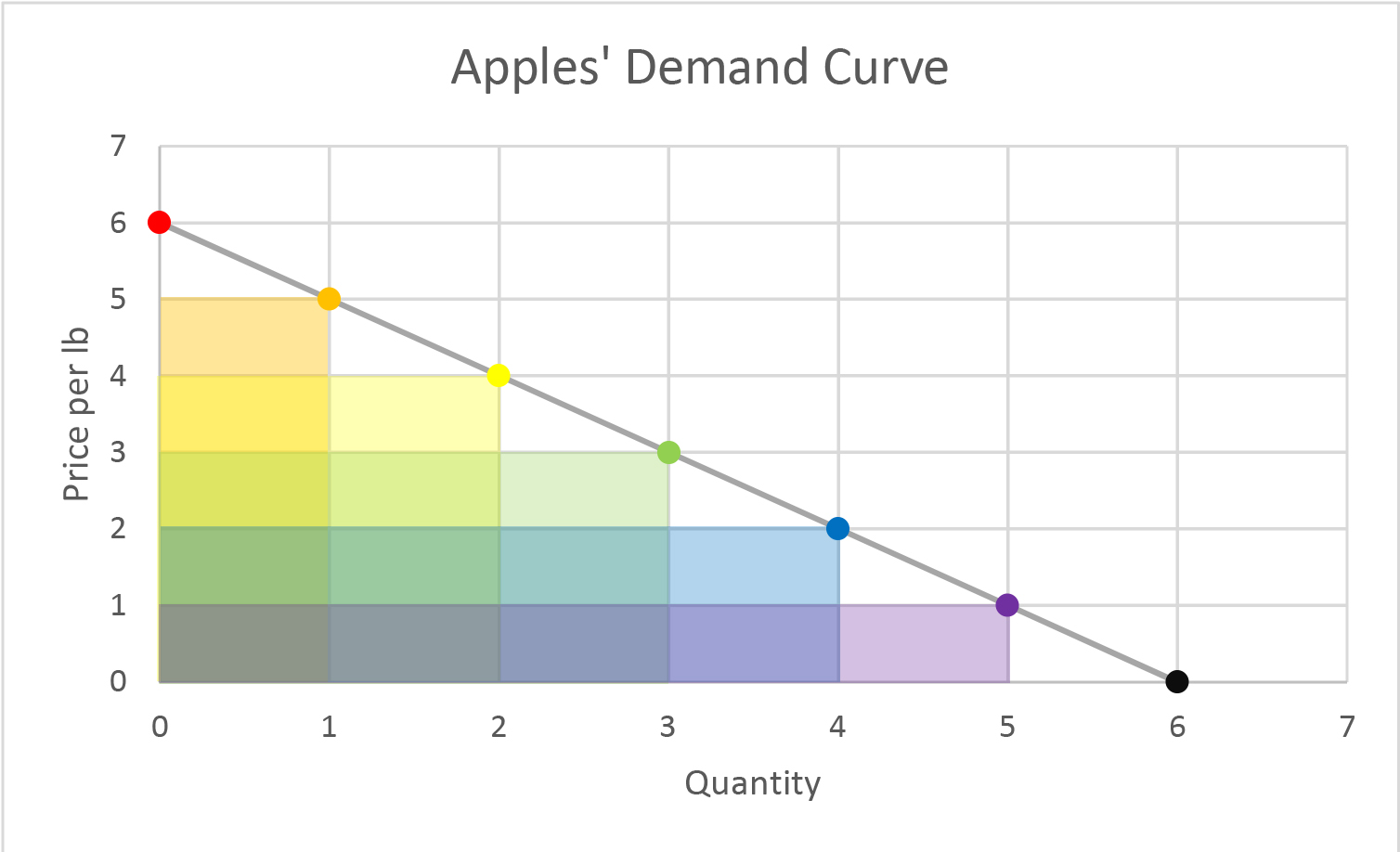
Figure 3

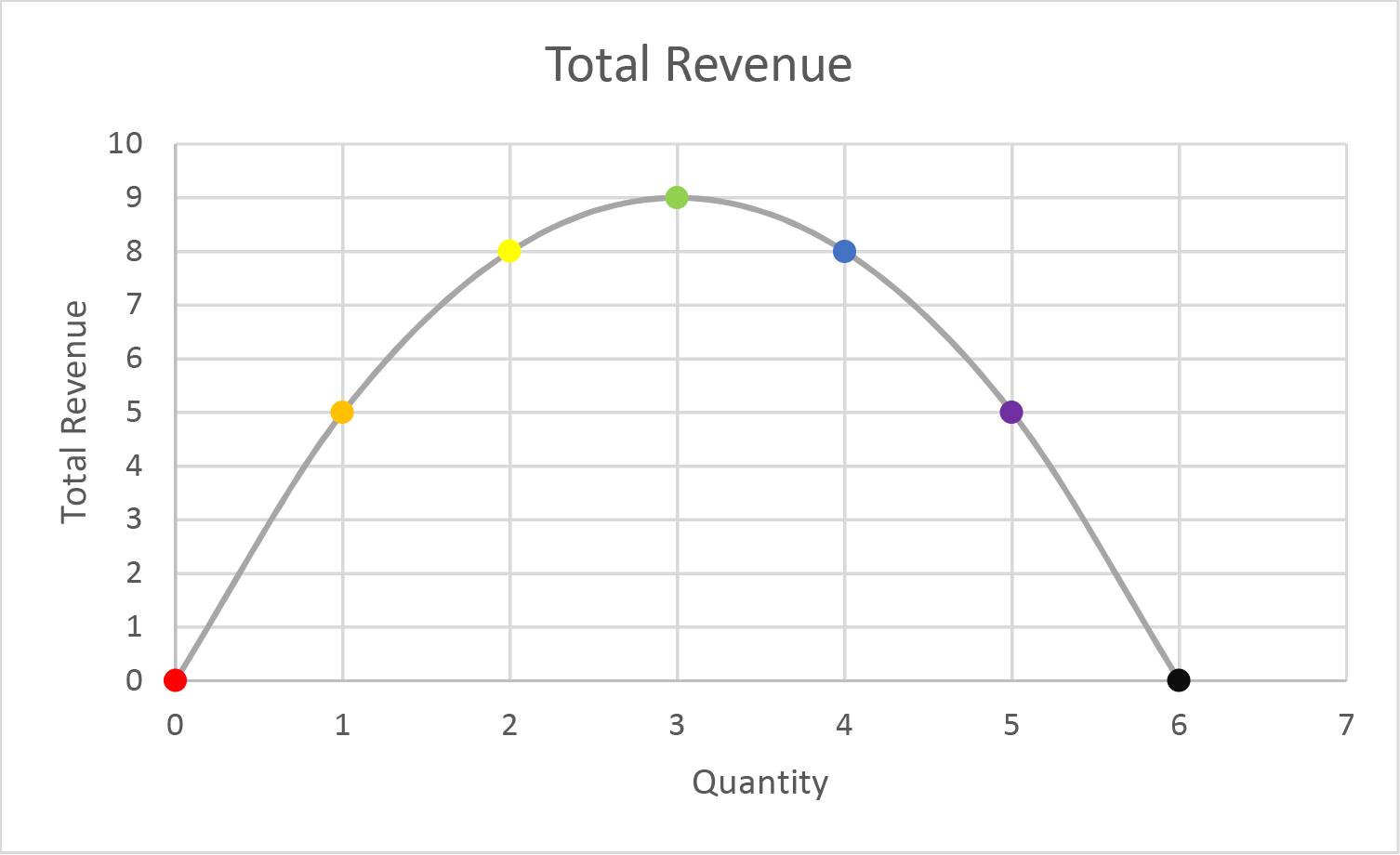
Figure 4

== Relationship between total revenue and elasticity ==
The function of TR is graphed as a downward opening parabola due to the concept of elasticity of demand. When price goes up, quantity will go down. Whether the total revenue will grow or drop depends on the original price and quantity and the slope of the demand curve. For example, total revenue will rise due to an increase in quantity if the percentage increase in quantity is larger than the percentage decrease in price. The percentage change in the price and quantity determine whether the demand for a product is elastic or inelastic.

The changes in total revenue are based on the price elasticity of demand, and there are general rules for them:

1. Price and total revenue have a positive relationship when demand is inelastic (price elasticity < 1), which means that when price increases, total revenue will increase too.
2. Price and total revenue have a negative relationship when demand is elastic (price elasticity > 1), which means that increases in price will lead to decreases in total revenue.
3. Price changes will not affect total revenue when the demand is unit elastic (price elasticity = 1). Maximum total revenue is achieved where the elasticity of demand is 1.

The above movements along the demand curve result from changes in supply:

1. When demand is inelastic, an increase in supply will lead to a decrease in total revenue while a decrease in supply will lead to an increase in total revenue.
2. When demand is elastic, an increase in supply will lead to an increase in total revenue while a decrease in supply will lead to a decrease in total revenue.

Rational people and firms are assumed to make the most profitable decision, and total revenue helps firms to make these decisions because the profit that a firm can earn depends on the total revenue and the total cost.

== Relationship between total revenue and operational decision ==
Total revenue can help with a firm's operational decision: whether the firm should be shut down or kept open.

In the short run, if the total revenue (TR) that a firm can earn from operating will not exceed the variable costs (VC) of operation, the firm should be shut down.

- If TR < VC, shut down.

In the long run, a similar rule also can be applied when a firm needs to decide whether it should enter or exit a market. Here physical capital costs are relevant, and together with variable costs they give total long-run costs (TC):

- If TR < TC, exit the market.

The rules are opposite for entering a market:

- If TR > TC, enter the market.

== See also ==
- Marginal revenue
- Profit maximization
