= Monopoly profit =

Economics term

Monopoly profit is an inflated level of profit due to the monopolistic practices of an enterprise.

== Basic classical and neoclassical theory ==
Traditional economics state that in a competitive market, no firm can command elevated premiums for the price of goods and services as a result of sufficient competition. In contrast, insufficient competition can provide a producer with disproportionate pricing power. Withholding production to drive prices higher produces additional profit, which is called monopoly profits.

According to classical and neoclassical economic thought, firms in a perfectly competitive market are price takers because no firm can charge a price that is different from the equilibrium price set within the entire industry's perfectly competitive market. Since a competitive market has many competing firms, a customer can buy widgets from any of the competing firms. Because of this tight competition, competing firms in a market each have their own horizontal demand curve that is fixed at a single price established by market equilibrium for the entire industry as a whole. Each firm in a competitive market has buyers for its product as long as the firm charges "no more than" the single price. Since firms cannot control the activities of other firms that produce the same widget sold within the market, a firm that charges a price that is higher than the industry's market equilibrium price would lose business; customers would respond by buying their widgets from other competing firms that charge the lower market equilibrium price, which makes deviation from the market equilibrium price impossible.

Perfect competition is commonly characterized by an idealized situation in which all firms within the industry produce exact comparable goods that are perfect substitutes. With the exception of commodity markets, this idealized situation does not typically exist in many actual markets, but in many cases, there exist similar products that are easily interchangeable because they are close substitutes (for example, butter and margarine). A significant rise in a product's price tends to cause customers to switch from this good to a lower priced close substitute. In some cases, firms that produce differing but similar goods have similar production processes, which makes it relatively easy for one-good firms to switch their manufacturing processes to produce a different but similar good. This would be the case when the cost of changing the firm's manufacturing process to produce the similar good can be somewhat immaterial in relationship to the firm's overall profit and cost. Since consumers tend to replace goods whose prices are high with cheaper close substitutes, and the existence of close substitutes whose manufacturing processes are similar allows a firm producing a low-priced good to easily switch over to producing the other higher priced good, the competition model accurately explains why the existence of different similar goods form competitive forces that deny any single firm the ability to establish a monopoly in their product. This effect is observable in a high profit and production cost industry, such as the car industry, and other industries facing competition from imports.

Individual competitive firms (on the extreme left and extreme right) are price takers, who are forced to accept the overall equilibrium price set by total consumer demand and the quantity all firms supply within the industry's market. The industry's market supply and demand show a graphical depiction of the interaction between all suppliers of the product and all consumers who may wish to purchase the product, and the decisions they make at any possible price.

By contrast, the lack of competition in a market ensures the firm (monopoly) has a downward sloping demand curve. Although raising prices causes the monopoly to lose some business, some sales can be made at higher prices. Although monopolists are constrained by consumer demand, they are not "price takers" because they can influence price through their production decisions. The monopolist can either have a target level of output that will ensure the monopoly price as the given consumer demand in the industry's market reacts to the fixed and limited market supply, or it can set a fixed monopoly price at the onset and adjust output until it can ensure no excess inventories occur at the final output level chosen. At each price, the firm must accept the level of output as determined by the market's consumer demand, and every output quantity is identified with a price that is determined by the market's consumer demand. The price and output are co-determined by consumer demand and the firm's production cost structure.

A firm with monopoly power sets a monopoly price that maximizes the monopoly profit. The most profitable price for the monopoly occurs when output level ensures the marginal cost (MC) equals the marginal revenue (MR) associated with the demand curve. Under normal market conditions for a monopolist, this monopoly price is higher than the marginal (economic) cost of producing the product, indicating that the price paid by the consumer, which is equal to their marginal benefit, is above the firm's MC.

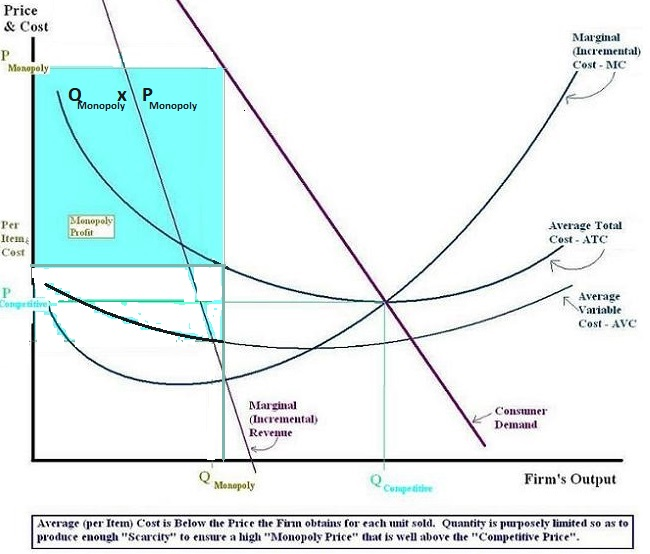
A monopolist will set a price and production quantity where MC = MR, such that MR is always below the monopoly price set. A competitive firm's MR is the price it gets for its product, and will have its price equal to MC.

== Persistence ==
Without barriers to entry and collusion in a market, the existence of a monopoly and monopoly profit cannot persist in the long run. Normally, when economic profit exists within an industry, economic agents form new firms in the industry to obtain at least a portion of the existing economic profit. As new firms enter the industry, they increase the supply of the product available in the market, and they are forced to charge a lower price to entice consumers to buy the additional supply they are supplying as competition. Since consumers flock toward the lowest price (in search of a bargain), older firms within the industry may lose their existing customers to the new firms entering the industry, and are forced to lower their prices to match the prices set by the new firms. New firms continue to enter the industry until the price of the product is lowered to the point that it is the same as the average economic cost of producing the product, and economic profit disappears. When this happens, economic agents outside of the industry find no advantage to entering the industry, supply of the product stops increasing, and the price charged for the product stabilizes.

Normally, a firm that introduces a brand new product can initially secure a monopoly for a short while. At this stage, the initial price the consumer must pay for the product is high, and the demand for, as well as the availability of the product in the market, will be limited. As time passes, when the profitability of the product is well established, the number of firms that produce this product will increase until the available product supply becomes relatively large, and the product's price shrinks down to the level of the average economic cost of producing the product. When this occurs, all monopoly associated with producing and selling the product disappears, and the initial monopoly turns into a (perfectly) competitive industry.

When consumers have complete information about the prices available in the market and the quality of the products sold by the various firms, there cannot be a persistent monopolistic situation in the absence of barriers to entry and collusion. Various barriers to entry include patent rights and the monopolization of a natural resource needed to produce a product. The American firm Alcoa Aluminum is a historical example of a monopoly due to natural resource control; its control of "practically every source of bauxite in the United States" was one key reason that "[it] was, for a long time, the sole producer of aluminum in the United States".

A barrier to entry can exist in a market situation that is characterized by a combination of high fixed costs in production and a relatively small demand within the firm's product market. Since a high fixed cost results in a higher product market unit costs at lower production levels, and lower unit costs at higher production levels, the combination of a small product market demand for the firm's product, and the high revenue levels the firm needs to cover the high fixed costs it faces, indicate the product market will be dominated by a single large firm that uses economies of scale to minimize both its unit cost and its product price. New firms would be reticent to enter a product market if an apparent slim economic profit can turn into an immediate economic loss for all firms upon a new entry. However, since the qualities of most economic markets make them contestable markets, there may be a greater magnitude of product differentiation within this overall market structure, making it similar to monopolistic competition.

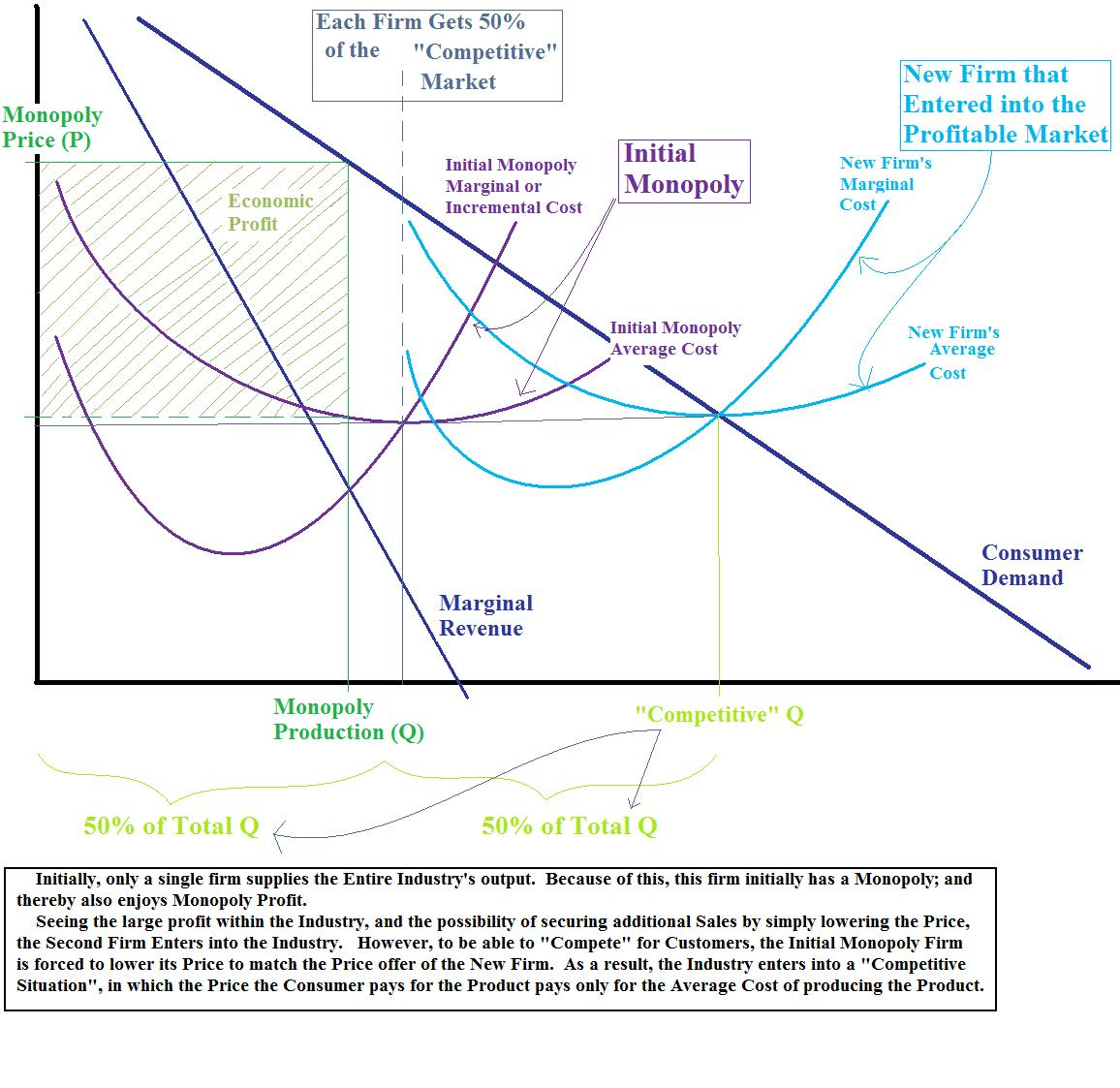
Introducing new competition in what was previously a monopoly removes monopoly profit. Only two firms are shown here to make illustration of the additional competition easier. In normal circumstances, it takes more than two firms to form a competitive situation, and having only two firms forms a duopoly.

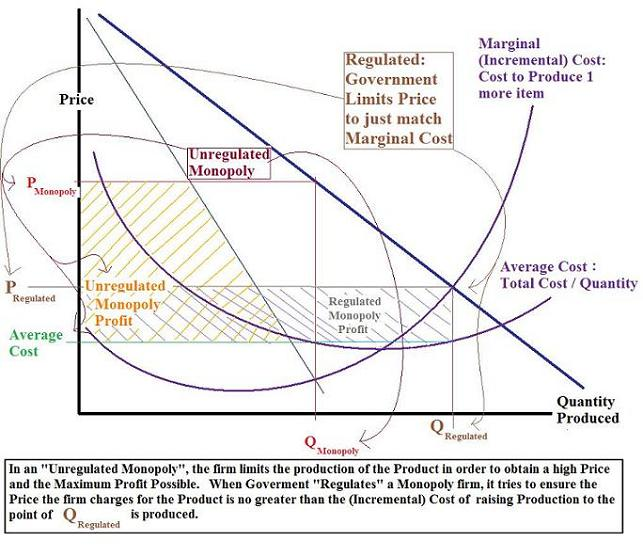
Government regulations of the price the monopoly can charge reduce the monopoly profit, but do not eliminate it.

== Government intervention ==
Competition laws were created to prevent powerful firms from using their economic power to artificially create the barriers to entry they need to protect their monopoly profits, including the use of predatory pricing toward smaller competitors. If firms in an industry collude they can also limit production to restrict supply, and ensure the price of the product remains high enough to ensure all of the firms in the industry achieve an economic profit.

If a government feels it is impractical to have a competitive market, it sometimes tries to regulate the monopoly by controlling the price the monopoly charges for its product. The old AT&T monopoly, which existed before the courts ordered its breakup and tried to force competition in the market, had to get government approval to raise its prices. The government examined the monopoly's costs and determined if the monopoly should be allowed to raise its price; if the government felt that the cost did not justify a higher price, it rejected the monopoly's application. Although a regulated monopoly will not have a monopoly profit that is high as it would be in an unregulated situation, it still can have an economic profit that is still above what a competitive firm has in a truly competitive market.

== See also ==
- Excess profits tax
- Profit margin
