= Perfect competition =

Market structure in which firms are price takers for a homogeneous product

In economics, specifically general equilibrium theory, a perfect market, also known as an atomistic market, is defined by several idealizing conditions, collectively called perfect competition, or atomistic competition. In theoretical models where conditions of perfect competition hold, it has been demonstrated that a market will reach an equilibrium in which the quantity supplied for every product or service, including labor, equals the quantity demanded at the current price. This equilibrium would be a Pareto optimum.

Perfect competition provides both allocative efficiency and productive efficiency:

- Such markets are allocatively efficient, as output will always occur where marginal cost is equal to average revenue i.e. price (MC = AR). In perfect competition, any profit-maximizing producer faces a market price equal to its marginal cost (P = MC). This implies that a factor's price equals the factor's marginal revenue product. It allows for derivation of the supply curve on which the neoclassical approach is based. This is also the reason why a monopoly does not have a supply curve. The abandonment of price taking creates considerable difficulties for the demonstration of a general equilibrium except under other, very specific conditions such as that of monopolistic competition.
- In the short-run, perfectly competitive markets are not necessarily productively efficient, as output will not always occur where marginal cost is equal to average cost (MC = AC). However, in the long-run, productive efficiency occurs as new firms enter the industry. Competition reduces price and cost to the minimum of the long run average costs. At this point, price equals both the marginal cost and the average total cost for each good (P = MC = AC).

The theory of perfect competition has its roots in late-19th century economic thought. Léon Walras gave the first rigorous definition of perfect competition and derived some of its main results. In the 1950s, the theory was further formalized by Kenneth Arrow and Gérard Debreu.

Imperfect competition was a theory created to explain the more realistic kind of market interaction that lies in between perfect competition and a monopoly. Edward Chamberlin wrote "Monopolistic Competition" in 1933 as "a challenge to the traditional viewpoint that competition and monopolies are alternatives and that individual prices are to be explained in either terms of one or the other" (Dewey,88.) In this book, and for much of his career, he "analyzed firms that do not produce identical goods, but goods that are close substitutes for one another" (Sandmo,300.)

Another key player in understanding imperfect competition is Joan Robinson, who published her book "The Economics of Imperfect Competition" the same year Chamberlain published his. While Chamberlain focused much of his work on product development, Robinson focused heavily on price formation and discrimination (Sandmo,303.) The act of price discrimination under imperfect competition implies that the seller would sell their goods at different prices depending on the characteristic of the buyer to increase revenue (Robinson,204.) Joan Robinson and Edward Chamberlain came to many of the same conclusions regarding imperfect competition while still adding a bit of their twist to the theory. Despite their similarities or disagreements about who discovered the idea, both were extremely helpful in allowing firms to understand better how to center their goods around the wants of the consumer to achieve the highest amount of revenue possible.

Real markets are never perfect. Those economists who believe in perfect competition as a useful approximation to real markets may classify those as ranging from close-to-perfect to very imperfect. The real estate market is an example of a very imperfect market. In such markets, the theory of the second best proves that if one optimality condition in an economic model cannot be satisfied, it is possible that the next-best solution involves changing other variables away from the values that would otherwise be optimal.

In modern conditions, the theory of perfect competition has been modified from a quantitative assessment of competitors to a more natural atomic balance (equilibrium) in the market. There may be many competitors in the market, but if there is hidden collusion between them, the competition will not be maximally perfect. But if the principle of atomic balance operates in the market, then even between two equal forces perfect competition may arise. If we try to artificially increase the number of competitors and to reduce honest local big business to small size, we will open the way for unscrupulous monopolies from outside.

== Idealizing conditions of perfect competition ==
The definition of perfect competition is when the following conditions all hold:

- A large number of sellers and buyers, or low barriers to entry and exit – A large number of consumers with the willingness and ability to buy the product at a certain price, and a large number of producers with the willingness and ability to supply the product at a certain price. As a result, individuals are unable to significantly influence prices. One requirement for this is non-increasing returns to scale (including network effects), ensuring that a monopoly doesn't push out competitors.
- Homogeneous products: The products are perfect substitutes for each other (i.e., the qualities and characteristics of a market good or service do not vary between different suppliers).
- Utility maximizing participants: Rational buyers always attempt to maximize their economic utility and sellers attempt to maximize their profit.
- Perfect information: All consumers and producers know all prices of products and utilities they would get from owning each product.
- Zero transaction costs: Buyers and sellers do not incur costs in making an exchange of goods. This includes no barriers to entry or exit (no sunk costs) and perfect factor mobility where the factors of production are perfectly mobile and costlessly, allowing workers to freely move between firms and other adjustments to changing market conditions.
- No externalities: Costs or benefits of an activity do not affect third parties. This criterion also excludes any government intervention.
- Well defined property rights: These determine what may be sold, as well as what rights are conferred on the buyer.

While no real market is perfect, many markets are considered to be near enough to perfect for predictions from economic theory to be reasonably accurate. It has been proven that if the above conditions hold, that every participant will be a price taker and will not have market power to set prices, and all sellers will operate such that their marginal costs equal their marginal revenue.

There are many instances in which there exist "similar" products that are close substitutes (such as butter and margarine), which are relatively easily interchangeable, so that a rise in the price of one good will cause a significant shift to the consumption of the close substitute. If the cost of changing a firm's manufacturing process to produce the substitute is also relatively "immaterial" in relationship to the firm's overall profit and cost, this is sufficient to ensure that an economic situation isn't significantly different from a perfectly competitive economic market.

== Normal profit ==
In a perfect market the sellers operate at zero economic surplus: sellers make a level of return on investment known as normal profits.

Normal profit is a component of (implicit) costs and not a component of business profit at all. It represents all the opportunity cost, as the time that the owner spends running the firm could be spent on running a different firm. The enterprise component of normal profit is thus the profit that a business owner considers necessary to make running the business worth while: that is, it is comparable to the next best amount the entrepreneur could earn doing another job. Particularly if enterprise is not included as a factor of production, it can also be viewed a return to capital for investors including the entrepreneur, equivalent to the return the capital owner could have expected (in a safe investment), plus compensation for risk. In other words, the cost of normal profit varies both within and across industries; it is commensurate with the riskiness associated with each type of investment, as per the risk–return spectrum.

In circumstances of perfect competition, only normal profits arise when the long run economic equilibrium is reached; there is no incentive for firms to either enter or leave the industry.

=== In competitive and contestable markets ===
Only in the short run can a firm in a perfectly competitive market make an economic profit.

Economic profit does not occur in perfect competition in long run equilibrium; if it did, there would be an incentive for new firms to enter the industry, aided by a lack of barriers to entry until there was no longer any economic profit. As new firms enter the industry, they increase the supply of the product available in the market, and these new firms are forced to charge a lower price to entice consumers to buy the additional supply these new firms are supplying as the firms all compete for customers (See "Persistence" in the Monopoly Profit discussion). Incumbent firms within the industry face losing their existing customers to the new firms entering the industry, and are therefore forced to lower their prices to match the lower prices set by the new firms. New firms will continue to enter the industry until the price of the product is lowered to the point that it is the same as the average cost of producing the product, and all of the economic profit disappears. When this happens, economic agents outside of the industry find no advantage to forming new firms that enter into the industry, the supply of the product stops increasing, and the price charged for the product stabilizes, settling into an equilibrium.

The same is likewise true of the long run equilibria of monopolistically competitive industries and, more generally, any market which is held to be contestable. Normally, a firm that introduces a differentiated product can initially secure a temporary market power for a short while (See "Persistence" in Monopoly Profit). At this stage, the initial price the consumer must pay for the product is high, and the demand for, as well as the availability of the product in the market, will be limited. In the long run, however, when the profitability of the product is well established, and because there are few barriers to entry, the number of firms that produce this product will increase until the available supply of the product eventually becomes relatively large, the price of the product shrinks down to the level of the average cost of producing the product. When this finally occurs, all monopoly profit associated with producing and selling the product disappears, and the initial monopoly turns into a competitive industry. In the case of contestable markets, the cycle is often ended with the departure of the former "hit and run" entrants to the market, returning the industry to its previous state, just with a lower price and no economic profit for the incumbent firms.

Profit can, however, occur in competitive and contestable markets in the short run, as firms jostle for market position. Once risk is accounted for, long-lasting economic profit in a competitive market is thus viewed as the result of constant cost-cutting and performance improvement ahead of industry competitors, allowing costs to be below the market-set price.

=== In non-competitive markets ===
A monopolist can set a price in excess of costs, making an economic profit. The above diagram shows a monopolist (only one firm in the market) that obtains a (monopoly) economic profit. An oligopoly usually has economic profit also, but operates in a market with more than just one firm (they must share available demand at the market price).

Economic profit is, however, much more prevalent in uncompetitive markets such as in a perfect monopoly or oligopoly situation. In these scenarios, individual firms have some element of market power: Though monopolists are constrained by consumer demand, they are not price takers, but instead either price-setters or quantity setters. This allows the firm to set a price that is higher than that which would be found in a similar but more competitive industry, allowing them economic profit in both the long and short run.

The existence of economic profits in the long run depends on the prevalence of barriers to entry: these stop other firms from entering into the industry and sapping away profits, as they would in a more competitive market. In cases where barriers are present, but more than one firm, firms can collude to limit production, thereby restricting supply in order to ensure that the price of the product remains high enough for all firms in the industry to achieve an economic profit.

However, some economists, for instance Steve Keen, a professor at the University of Western Sydney, argue that even an infinitesimal amount of market power can allow a firm to produce a profit and that the absence of economic profit in an industry, or even merely that some production occurs at a loss, in and of itself constitutes a barrier to entry.

In a single-goods case, a positive economic profit happens when the firm's average cost is less than the price of the product or service at the profit-maximizing output. The economic profit is equal to the quantity of output multiplied by the difference between the average cost and the price.

=== Government intervention ===
Often, governments will try to intervene in uncompetitive markets to make them more competitive. Antitrust (US) or competition (elsewhere) laws were created to prevent powerful firms from using their economic power to artificially create the barriers to entry they need to protect their economic profits. This includes the use of predatory pricing toward smaller competitors. For example, in the United States, Microsoft Corporation was initially convicted of breaking Anti-Trust Law and engaging in anti-competitive behavior in order to form one such barrier in United States v. Microsoft; after a successful appeal on technical grounds, Microsoft agreed to a settlement with the Department of Justice in which they were faced with stringent oversight procedures and explicit requirements designed to prevent this predatory behaviour. With lower barriers, new firms can enter the market again, making the long run equilibrium more like that of a competitive industry, with no economic profit for firms.

In a regulated industry, the government examines firms' marginal cost structure and allows them to charge a price that is no greater than this marginal cost. This does not necessarily ensure zero Economic profit for the firm, but eliminates a "Pure Monopoly" Profit.

If a government feels it is impractical to have a competitive market – such as in the case of a natural monopoly – it will sometimes try to regulate the existing uncompetitive market by controlling the price firms charge for their product. For example, the old AT&T (regulated) monopoly, which existed before the courts ordered its breakup, had to get government approval to raise its prices. The government examined the monopoly's costs to determine whether the monopoly should be able raise its price, and could reject the monopoly's application for a higher price if the cost did not justify it. Although a regulated firm will not have an economic profit as large as it would in an unregulated situation, it can still make profits well above a competitive firm in a truly competitive market.

== Results ==
In the short run, it is possible for an individual firm to make an economic profit. This situation is shown in this diagram, as the price or average revenue, denoted by $\text{P}$, is above the average cost denoted by $\text{C}$ .

However, in the long run, economic profit cannot be sustained. The arrival of new firms or expansion of existing firms (if returns to scale are constant) in the market causes the (horizontal) demand curve of each individual firm to shift downward, bringing down at the same time the price, the average revenue and marginal revenue curve. The outcome is that, in the long run, the firm will make only normal profit (zero economic profit). Its horizontal demand curve will touch its average total cost curve at its lowest point. (See cost curve.)

In a perfectly competitive market, the demand curve facing a firm is perfectly elastic.

As mentioned above, the perfect competition model, if interpreted as applying also to short-period or very-short-period behaviour, is approximated only by markets of homogeneous products produced and purchased by very many sellers and buyers, usually organized markets for agricultural products or raw materials. In real-world markets, assumptions such as perfect information cannot be verified and are only approximated in organized double-auction markets where most agents wait and observe the behaviour of prices before deciding to exchange (but in the long-period interpretation perfect information is not necessary, the analysis only aims at determining the average around which market prices gravitate, and for gravitation to operate one does not need perfect information).

In the absence of externalities and public goods, perfectly competitive equilibria are Pareto-efficient, i.e. no improvement in the utility of a consumer is possible without a worsening of the utility of some other consumer. This is called the First Theorem of Welfare Economics. The basic reason is that no productive factor with a non-zero marginal product is left unutilized, and the units of each factor are so allocated as to yield the same indirect marginal utility in all uses, a basic efficiency condition (if this indirect marginal utility were higher in one use than in other ones, a Pareto improvement could be achieved by transferring a small amount of the factor to the use where it yields a higher marginal utility).

A simple proof assuming differentiable utility functions and production functions is the following. Let $w_j$ be the 'price' (the rental) of a certain factor $j$, let $\text{MP}_{j1}$ and $\text{MP}_{j2}$ be its marginal product in the production of goods $1$ and $2$, and let $p_1$ and $p_2$ be these goods' prices. In equilibrium these prices must equal the respective marginal costs $\text{MC}_1$ and $\text{MC}_2$; remember that marginal cost equals factor 'price' divided by factor marginal productivity (because increasing the production of good by one very small unit through an increase of the employment of factor $j$ requires increasing the factor employment by $\frac{1}{\text{MP}_{ji}}$ and thus increasing the cost by $\frac{w_j}{\text{MP}_{ji}}$, and through the condition of cost minimization that marginal products must be proportional to factor 'prices' it can be shown that the cost increase is the same if the output increase is obtained by optimally varying all factors). Optimal factor employment by a price-taking firm requires equality of factor rental and factor marginal revenue product, $w_j=p_i \text{MP}_{ji}$, so we obtain $p_1=\text{MC}_{j1}=\frac{w_j}{\text{MP}_{j1}}$, $p_2=\text{MC}_{j2}=\frac{w_j}{\text{MP}_{j2}}$.

Now choose any consumer purchasing both goods, and measure his utility in such units that in equilibrium his marginal utility of money (the increase in utility due to the last unit of money spent on each good), $\frac{\text{MU}_1}{p_1}=\frac{\text{MU}_2}{p_2}$, is 1. Then $p_1=\text{MU}_1$, $p_2=\text{MU}_2$. The indirect marginal utility of the factor is the increase in the utility of our consumer achieved by an increase in the employment of the factor by one (very small) unit; this increase in utility through allocating the small increase in factor utilization to good $1$ is $\text{MP}_{j1} \text{MU}_1=\text{MP}_{j1} p_1=w_j$, and through allocating it to good $2$ it is $\text{MP}_{j2} \text{MU}_2=\text{MP}_{j2} p_2=w_j$ again. With our choice of units the marginal utility of the amount of the factor consumed directly by the optimizing consumer is again w, so the amount supplied of the factor too satisfies the condition of optimal allocation.

Monopoly violates this optimal allocation condition, because in a monopolized industry market price is above marginal cost, and this means that factors are underutilized in the monopolized industry, they have a higher indirect marginal utility than in their uses in competitive industries. Of course, this theorem is considered irrelevant by economists who do not believe that general equilibrium theory correctly predicts the functioning of market economies; but it is given great importance by neoclassical economists and it is the theoretical reason given by them for combating monopolies and for antitrust legislation.

=== Profit ===
In contrast to a monopoly or oligopoly, in perfect competition it is impossible for a firm to earn economic profit in the long run, which is to say that a firm cannot make any more money than is necessary to cover its economic costs. In order not to misinterpret this zero-long-run-profits thesis, it must be remembered that the term 'profit' is used in different ways:

- Neoclassical theory defines profit as what is left of revenue after all costs have been subtracted; including normal interest on capital plus the normal excess over it required to cover risk, and normal salary for managerial activity. This means that profit is calculated after the actors are compensated for their opportunity costs.
- Classical economists on the contrary define profit as what is left after subtracting costs except interest and risk coverage. Thus, the classical approach does not account for opportunity costs.

Thus, if one leaves aside risk coverage for simplicity, the neoclassical zero-long-run-profit thesis would be re-expressed in classical parlance as profits coinciding with interest in the long period (i.e. the rate of profit tending to coincide with the rate of interest). Profits in the classical meaning do not necessarily disappear in the long period but tend to normal profit. With this terminology, if a firm is earning abnormal profit in the short term, this will act as a trigger for other firms to enter the market. As other firms enter the market, the market supply curve will shift out, causing prices to fall. Existing firms will react to this lower price by adjusting their capital stock downward. This adjustment will cause their marginal cost to shift to the left causing the market supply curve to shift inward. However, the net effect of entry by new firms and adjustment by existing firms will be to shift the supply curve outward. The market price will be driven down until all firms are earning normal profit only.

Perfect competition is a sufficient condition for allocative and productive efficiency, but it is not a necessary condition. Laboratory experiments in which participants have significant price setting power and little or no information about their counterparts consistently produce efficient results given the proper trading institutions.

== Shutdown point ==
In the short run, a firm operating at a loss [$\text{R} < \text{TC}$ (revenue less than total cost) or $P < \text{ATC}$ (price less than unit cost)] must decide whether to continue to operate or temporarily shut down. The shutdown rule states "in the short run a firm should continue to operate if price exceeds average variable costs". Restated, the rule is that for a firm to continue producing in the short run it must earn sufficient revenue to cover its variable costs. The rationale for the rule is straightforward: By shutting down a firm avoids all variable costs. However, the firm must still pay fixed costs. Because fixed costs must be paid regardless of whether a firm operates they should not be considered in deciding whether to produce or shut down. Thus in determining whether to shut down a firm should compare total revenue to total variable costs ($\text{VC}$) rather than total costs ($\text{FC} + \text{VC}$). If the revenue the firm is receiving is greater than its total variable cost ($\text{R} > \text{VC}$), then the firm is covering all variable costs and there is additional revenue ("contribution"), which can be applied to fixed costs. (The size of the fixed costs is irrelevant as it is a sunk cost. The same consideration is used whether fixed costs are one dollar or one million dollars.) On the other hand, if $\text{VC} > \text{R}$ then the firm is not covering its production costs and it should immediately shut down. The rule is conventionally stated in terms of price (average revenue) and average variable costs. The rules are equivalent (if one divides both sides of inequality $\text{TR} > \text{TVC}$ by $Q$ gives $P > \text{AVC}$). If the firm decides to operate, the firm will continue to produce where marginal revenue equals marginal costs because these conditions insure not only profit maximization (loss minimization) but also maximum contribution.

Another way to state the rule is that a firm should compare the profits from operating to those realized if it shut down and select the option that produces the greater profit. A firm that is shut down is generating zero revenue and incurring no variable costs. However, the firm still has to pay fixed cost. So the firm's profit equals fixed costs or $-\text{FC}$. An operating firm is generating revenue, incurring variable costs and paying fixed costs. The operating firm's profit is $\text{R} - \text{VC} - \text{FC}$. The firm should continue to operate if $\text{R} - \text{VC} - \text{FC} \geq -\text{FC}$, which simplified is $\text{R} \geq \text{VC}$. The difference between revenue, $\text{R}$, and variable costs, $\text{VC}$, is the contribution to fixed costs and any contribution is better than none. Thus, if $\text{R} \geq \text{VC}$ then firm should operate. If $\text{R} < \text{VC}$ the firm should shut down.

A decision to shut down means that the firm is temporarily suspending production. It does not mean that the firm is going out of business (exiting the industry). If market conditions improve, and prices increase, the firm can resume production. Shutting down is a short-run decision. A firm that has shut down is not producing. The firm still retains its capital assets; however, the firm cannot leave the industry or avoid its fixed costs in the short run. Exit is a long-term decision. A firm that has exited an industry has avoided all commitments and freed all capital for use in more profitable enterprises.

However, a firm cannot continue to incur losses indefinitely. In the long run, the firm will have to earn sufficient revenue to cover all its expenses and must decide whether to continue in business or to leave the industry and pursue profits elsewhere. The long-run decision is based on the relationship of the price and long-run average costs. If $P \geq AC$ then the firm will not exit the industry. If $P < \text{AC}$, then the firm will exit the industry. These comparisons will be made after the firm has made the necessary and feasible long-term adjustments. In the long run a firm operates where marginal revenue equals long-run marginal costs.

== Short-run supply curve ==
The short-run ($\text{SR}$) supply curve for a perfectly competitive firm is the marginal cost ($\text{MC}$) curve at and above the shutdown point. Portions of the marginal cost curve below the shutdown point are not part of the $\text{SR}$ supply curve because the firm is not producing any positive quantity in that range. Technically the $\text{SR}$ supply curve is a discontinuous function composed of the segment of the $\text{MC}$ curve at and above minimum of the average variable cost curve and a segment that runs on the vertical axis from the origin to but not including a point at the height of the minimum average variable cost.

== Criticisms ==
The use of the assumption of perfect competition as the foundation of price theory for product markets is often criticized as representing all agents as passive, thus removing the active attempts to increase one's welfare or profits by price undercutting, product design, advertising, innovation, activities that – the critics argue – characterize most industries and markets. These criticisms point to the frequent lack of realism of the assumptions of product homogeneity and impossibility to differentiate it, but apart from this, the accusation of passivity appears correct only for short-period or very-short-period analyses, in long-period analyses the inability of price to diverge from the natural or long-period price is due to active reactions of entry or exit.

Some economists have a different kind of criticism concerning perfect competition model. They are not criticizing the price taker assumption because it makes economic agents too "passive", but because it then raises the question of who sets the prices. Indeed, if everyone is price taker, there is the need for a benevolent planner who gives and sets the prices, in other word, there is a need for a "price maker". Therefore, it makes the perfect competition model appropriate not to describe a decentralized "market" economy but a centralized one. This in turn means that such kind of model has more to do with communism than capitalism.

Another frequent criticism is that it is often not true that in the short run differences between supply and demand cause changes in price; especially in manufacturing, the more common behaviour is alteration of production without nearly any alteration of price.

The critics of the assumption of perfect competition in product markets seldom question the basic neoclassical view of the working of market economies for this reason. The Austrian School insists strongly on this criticism, and yet the neoclassical view of the working of market economies as fundamentally efficient, reflecting consumer choices and assigning to each agent his contribution to social welfare, is esteemed to be fundamentally correct. Some non-neoclassical schools, like Post-Keynesians, reject the neoclassical approach to value and distribution, but not because of their rejection of perfect competition as a reasonable approximation to the working of most product markets; the reasons for rejection of the neoclassical 'vision' are different views of the determinants of income distribution and of aggregated demand.

In particular, the rejection of perfect competition does not generally entail the rejection of free competition as characterizing most product markets; indeed it has been argued that competition is stronger nowadays than in 19th century capitalism, owing to the increasing capacity of big conglomerate firms to enter any industry: therefore the classical idea of a tendency toward a uniform rate of return on investment in all industries owing to free entry is even more valid today; and the reason why General Motors, Exxon or Nestlé do not enter the computers or pharmaceutical industries is not insurmountable barriers to entry but rather that the rate of return in the latter industries is already sufficiently in line with the average rate of return elsewhere as not to justify entry. On this few economists, it would seem, would disagree, even among the neoclassical ones. Thus when the issue is normal, or long-period, product prices, differences on the validity of the perfect competition assumption do not appear to imply important differences on the existence or not of a tendency of rates of return toward uniformity as long as entry is possible, and what is found fundamentally lacking in the perfect competition model is the absence of marketing expenses and innovation as causes of costs that do enter normal average cost.

The issue is different with respect to factor markets. Here the acceptance or denial of perfect competition in labour markets does make a big difference to the view of the working of market economies. One must distinguish neoclassical from non-neoclassical economists. For the former, absence of perfect competition in labour markets, e.g. due to the existence of trade unions, impedes the smooth working of competition, which if left free to operate would cause a decrease of wages as long as there were unemployment, and would finally ensure the full employment of labour: labour unemployment is due to absence of perfect competition in labour markets. Most non-neoclassical economists deny that a full flexibility of wages would ensure the full employment of labour and find a stickiness of wages an indispensable component of a market economy, without which the economy would lack the regularity and persistence indispensable to its smooth working. This was, for example, John Maynard Keynes's opinion.

Acemoglu (2023) views perfect competition primarily as a theoretical benchmark and emphasizes that real-world markets are rarely perfectly competitive. Perfect competition assumes many buyers and sellers, none of whom possess market power, so that wages and prices are determined solely by supply and demand. He argues that, in practice, firms and labor markets are characterized by frictions, institutional constraints, and market power that violate these assumptions. In reality, markets frequently deviate from the perfectly competitive model.

Particularly radical is the view of the Sraffian school on this issue: the labour demand curve cannot be determined hence a level of wages ensuring the equality between supply and demand for labour does not exist, and economics should resume the viewpoint of the classical economists, according to whom competition in labour markets does not and cannot mean indefinite price flexibility as long as supply and demand are unequal, it only means a tendency to equality of wages for similar work, but the level of wages is necessarily determined by complex sociopolitical elements; custom, feelings of justice, informal allegiances to classes, as well as overt coalitions such as trade unions, far from being impediments to a smooth working of labour markets that would be able to determine wages even without these elements, are on the contrary indispensable because without them there would be no way to determine wages.

== Equilibrium in perfect competition ==
Equilibrium in perfect competition is the point where market demands will be equal to market supply. A firm's price will be determined at this point. In the short run, equilibrium will be affected by demand. In the long run, both demand and supply of a product will affect the equilibrium in perfect competition. A firm will receive only normal profit in the long run at the equilibrium point.

As it is well known, requirements for a firm's cost-curve under perfect competition is for the slope to move upwards after a certain amount is produced. This amount is small enough to leave a sufficiently large number of firms in the field (for any given total outputs in the industry) for the conditions of perfect competition to be preserved. For the short-run, the supply of some factors are assumed to be fixed and as the price of the other factors are given, costs per unit must necessarily rise after a certain point. From a theoretical point of view, given the assumptions that there will be a tendency for continuous growth in size for firms, long-period static equilibrium alongside perfect competition may be incompatible.

== See also ==
- Supply and demand
- Contestable market
- Effective competition
- Imperfect competition
- Monopolistic competition
- Microeconomics
- Bertrand competition
- Cournot competition
- Efficient-market hypothesis

== Bibliography ==
- Arrow, K. J. (1959), "Toward a theory of price adjustment", in M. Abramovitz (ed.), The Allocation of Economic Resources, Stanford: Stanford University Press, pp. 41–51.
- Aumann, R. J. (1964), "Markets with a Continuum of Traders", Econometrica, Vol. 32, No. 1/2, Jan.–Apr., pp. 39–50.
- Dewey, Donald. “Monopolistic Competition as a Mathematical Complication.” The Theory of Imperfect Competition: A Radical Reconstruction, Columbia Univ. Press, New York, NY, 1969.
- Frank, R., Microeconomics and Behavior 7th ed. (McGraw-Hill) ISBN 978-0-07-126349-8.
- Garegnani, P. (1990), "Sraffa: classical versus marginalist analysis", in K. Bharadwaj and B. Schefold (eds), Essays on Piero Sraffa, London: Unwin and Hyman, pp. 112–40 (reprinted 1992 by Routledge, London).
- Kirzner, I. (1981), "The 'Austrian' perspective on the crisis", in D. Bell and I. Kristol (eds), The Crisis in Economic Theory, New York: Basic Books, pp. 111–38.
- Kreps, D. M. (1990), A Course in Microeconomic Theory, New York: Harvester Wheatsheaf.
- Lee, F.S. (1998), Post-Keynesian Price Theory, Cambridge: Cambridge University Press.
- McNulty, P. J. (1967), "A note on the history of perfect competition", Journal of Political Economy, vol. 75, no. 4 pt. 1, August, pp. 395–99
- Novshek, W., and H. Sonnenschein (1987), "General Equilibrium with Free Entry: A Synthetic Approach to the Theory of Perfect Competition", Journal of Economic Literature, Vol. 25, No. 3, September, pp. 1281–306.
- Petri, F. (2004), General Equilibrium, Capital and Macroeconomics, Cheltenham: Edward Elgar.
- Roberts, J. (1987). "Perfectly and imperfectly competitive markets", The New Palgrave: A Dictionary of Economics, v. 3, pp. 837–41.
- Robinson, Joan. “Chapter 16.” The Theory of Imperfect Competition, 2nd ed.
- Sandmo, Agnar. “Chapter 13: New Prospectives on Markets and Competition.” Economics Evolving: A History of Economic Thought, Princeton University Press, Princeton, NJ, 2011.
- Smith V. L. (1987). "Experimental methods in economics", The New Palgrave: A Dictionary of Economics, v. 2, pp. 241–49.
- Stigler J. G. (1987). "Competition", The New Palgrave: A Dictionary of Economics, Ist edition, vol. 3, pp. 531–46.
