= Excess profits tax =

Tax on monopoly profits

An excess profits tax (EPT) is a tax on returns or profits which exceed risk-adjusted normal returns. The concept of excess profit is very similar to that of economic rent. Excess profit taxes are usually imposed on monopoly profits.

Excess profits taxes have often, but not exclusively, been imposed during wartime or in response to an event which provides some with an extraordinary ability to earn windfall gains. Windfall taxes have often been proposed, and sometimes imposed, in order to discourage profiteering from temporary increases in resource prices, such as those for oil or gas. Wartime excess profits taxes, or War Profits Taxes, have been employed to reduce perverse incentives to engage in war profiteering.

== Excess profits tax in COVID-19 ==
In history, excess profits taxes were imposed during times of war as war requires an excess amount of money. However, many countries imposed an excess profits tax during COVID to fund extra healthcare workers and to implement protection, such as masks. Equally, from the onset of the pandemic to March 2021, the global fiscal response to mitigate the extensive health and economic impacts was unprecedented, totalling US$16 trillion in 2020 (IMF, 2021). However, the pandemic's impact on businesses was uneven, with some sectors, notably information technology and pharmaceuticals, seeing significant profit surges and increased stock prices in the year following the outbreak.

== Examples ==
EPTs were introduced in Europe, North America, and Japan during the First and Second World Wars.

Windfall profit taxes were enacted following COVID-19.

=== United Kingdom ===
In 1915, the British government negotiated a deal between industrial capital representatives and organized labor. This arrangement exchanged labor dilution and wage moderation for a commitment to cap the profits of companies involved in war-related activities.

The Treasury rejected proposals for a stiff capital levy, which the Labour Party wanted to use to weaken the capitalists. Instead, there was an excess profits tax, of 50 percent of profits above the normal prewar level; the rate was raised to 80 percent in 1917. Excise taxes were added on luxury imports such as automobiles, clocks and watches. There was no sales tax or value added tax at this time in Britain.

=== United States ===
In 1863, the Confederate congress and the state of Georgia experimented with excess profits taxes, perhaps the first time it has happened in American history.

The first effective American excess profits tax was enacted by the Special Preparedness Fund Act in 1917, with rates graduated from 20 to 60 percent on the profits of all businesses in excess of prewar earnings but not less than 7 percent or more than 9 percent of invested capital. In 1918, a national law limited the tax to corporations and increased the rates. Concurrent with this 1918 tax, the federal government imposed, for the year 1918 only, an alternative tax, ranging up to 80 percent, with the taxpayer paying whichever was higher. In 1921, the excess profits tax was repealed despite powerful attempts to make it permanent. In 1933 and 1935, Congress enacted two mild excess profits taxes as supplements to a capital stock tax.

The crisis of World War II led Congress to pass four excess profits statutes between 1940 and 1943. The 1940 rates ranged from 25 to 50 percent and the 1941 ones from 35 to 60 percent. In 1942, a flat rate of 90 percent was adopted, with a postwar refund of 10 percent; in 1943 the rate was increased to 95 percent, with a 10 percent refund. Congress gave corporations two alternative excess profits tax credit choices: either 95 percent of average earnings for 1936–1939 or an invested capital credit, initially 8 percent of capital but later graduated from 5 to 8 percent. In 1945 Congress repealed the tax, effective 1 January 1946. The Korean War induced Congress to reimpose an excess profits tax, effective from 1 July 1950 to 31 December 1953. The tax rate was 30 percent of excess profits with the top corporate tax rate rising from 45% to 47%, a 70 percent ceiling for the combined corporation and excess profits taxes.

In 1991, some members of Congress sought unsuccessfully to pass an excess profits tax of 40 percent upon the larger oil companies as part of energy policy. Some social reformers have championed a peacetime use of the excess profits tax, but such proposals face strong opposition from businesses and some economists, who argue that it would create a disincentive to capital investment.

=== Canada ===
Canada was the first country to impose an EPT during the Second World War. A tax rate of 75 percent was applied to profits surpassing a 10 percent return on capital, classifying it as an excess profit tax. Additionally, a baseline tax rate of 22 percent on overall profits was set, which was subsequently increased to 30 percent.

The term "excess" used in the title of Canada's Excess Profits Tax Act during wartime inherently defines the legislative intent to cap corporate earnings at levels deemed reasonable under extraordinary circumstances. "Excess," as described in legal terminology, refers to surpassing what is considered proper or reasonable. This legislative framework explicitly establishes that any profits beyond the standard profits, as specified in the Act, are beyond what is reasonably acceptable during wartime. Mathematically, this was initially quantified as profits not exceeding 155.69% of a company's standard profits before the end of June. However, amendments to the Act later adjusted this cap downward to 116.66% of the standard profits from the start of July, enforcing that any profit above this threshold attracts the excess profits tax.

=== Denmark ===
Denmark was the first country to impose an excess profits tax on food exporters. During the first World War, Danish authorities levied these taxes on food exporters who had been granted special trading permits to conduct business with Germany. The rationale behind this tax was to curb the excessive gains garnered by taxpayers who profited from the global crisis, often referred to as profiteering from the "world's misery." This move was seen as a crucial strategy to bolster government tax collections at a time when there was an urgent need to enhance revenue streams to fund national wartime efforts.

=== Hungary ===
Hungary imposed an excess profits tax to address fiscal needs and economic imbalances exacerbated by global challenges such as the COVID-19 pandemic and rising inflation. Hungary recently imposed an excess profits tax aimed towards specific industries such as banks and airline industries. As with most excess profit taxes it is temporary. The imposition of this tax is expected to bring in 800 billion HUF a year.

=== Netherlands ===
Holland imposed EPTs in 1916. War profit was identified as any profit that surpasses the average profits of the previous three years. The structure of the EPT was designed progressively, with rates varying from 10% to 30%. Additionally, under certain conditions, a 5% capital allowance was permissible.

In November 2022, the Dutch government introduced a temporary EPT as a strategic response to mitigate the impact of surging energy prices. This 33% tax targets companies operating within the oil, natural gas, coal, and petroleum refining industries. The tax applies to profits that exceed the average profit margins of these sectors by more than 20% during the reference period from 2018 to 2021, as specified by the ministry. This measure is intended to buffer the financial shock experienced by consumers and stabilize market fluctuations in the energy sector.

=== Italy ===
In 2023, Italian government announced a new windfall profits tax on banks, targeting their excess profits with a 40% tax rate. This move led to a €9.2 billion drop in market value for the affected firms, significantly more than the tax's expected revenue of up to €3 billion. The tax applies to the greater increase in net interest margins from 2021 to either 2022 or 2023, beyond thresholds of 5% and 10%, respectively. It's designed as a temporary measure for fiscal year 2023, non-deductible against other taxes.

In reaction to initial market impacts, the government introduced a 0.1% asset-based cap on the tax, which stabilized banking shares somewhat. The rationale behind the tax is to fund initiatives that alleviate the cost-of-living crisis and support first-time homeowners. However, the tax is critiqued for potentially increasing loan costs, limiting lending, and distorting competition. Critics also argue that it targets normal profits rather than true windfalls, risking investment and economic stability.

=== Greece ===
In November 2022, Greece responded to soaring energy prices by imposing a 90% excess profits tax on energy companies. The Greek energy minister justified this decision by stating, "Our primary concern is to maintain affordable prices on consumer bills until the end of this major, pan-European energy crisis." The tax revenues were used to subsidize energy prices.

== Debate ==
EPTs can be particularly effective when applied as one-off, retrospective taxes in response to unforeseen events. They target profits that exceed typical earnings unexpectedly, and since the investment decisions related to these profits have already been made, the taxes are relatively easy to enforce and comply with, and are difficult to avoid. The primary theoretical argument in favor of EPTs is rooted in the concept of economic efficiency. Taxes on economic rents (excess profits) are considered efficient because they theoretically do not impact the decision to invest. This is based on the idea that as long as the tax is levied only on returns that exceed the normal return required to justify an investment, it doesn't affect the baseline profitability that motivates the investment in the first place.

In 1942, Frederick T Collins at the Canadian Bar foundation said this about EPT:

The object of all taxation is to raise revenue, and excess profits taxation within its proper limits is, in wartime, the fairest and the best way to raise the money necessary to carry on total war as we know it today.

Despite the theoretical ideal, real-world applications of EPTs often show that they do affect corporate behavior and investment decisions. For instance, historical applications of windfall taxes have sometimes led to reduced investment, as companies may hold back on expanding or entering new projects due to uncertainty about future tax liabilities. The U.S. excess profits tax on oil production in the 1980s, which reduced oil output, is a key example where empirical evidence contradicts theoretical predictions.

Another argument is the ability of EPTs to mend fundamental distortion in many existing tax frameworks—that of favoring debt financing over equity financing. Typically, corporate tax systems allow deductions for interest paid on debt, but do not offer a corresponding deduction for returns paid on equity. This creates a financial incentive for companies to rely more heavily on borrowed money rather than equity financing, which can increase financial risk and instability, a problem that has been starkly highlighted during periods of economic turmoil, such as financial crises.

== See also ==
- Inheritance tax
- Land value tax
- Profit margin
- Windfall profits tax
