= Marginal revenue productivity theory of wages =

Model of wage levels

The marginal revenue productivity theory of wages is a model of wage levels in which they set to match to the marginal revenue product of labor, $MRP$ (the value of the marginal product of labor), which is the increment to revenues caused by the increment to output produced by the last laborer employed. In a model, this is justified by an assumption that the firm is profit-maximizing and thus would employ labor only up to the point that marginal labor costs equal the marginal revenue generated for the firm. This is a model of the neoclassical economics type.

The marginal revenue product ($MRP$) of a worker is equal to the product of the marginal product of labour ($MP$) (the increment to output from an increment to labor used) and the marginal revenue ($MR$) (the increment to sales revenue from an increment to output): $MRP = MP \times MR$. The theory states that workers will be hired up to the point when the marginal revenue product is equal to the wage rate. If the marginal revenue brought by the worker is less than the wage rate, then employing that laborer would cause a decrease in profit.

The idea that payments to factors of production equal their marginal productivity had been laid out by John Bates Clark and Knut Wicksell in simpler models. Much of the MRP theory stems from Wicksell's model.

== Mathematical relation ==
The marginal revenue product of labour $MRP_L$ is the increase in revenue per unit increase in the variable input = $\frac{\Delta TR}{\Delta L}$

$$\begin{align}
MR &= \frac{\Delta TR}{\Delta Q}\\[5pt]
MP_L &= \frac{\Delta Q}{\Delta L}\\[5pt]
MR \times MP_L &= \frac{\Delta TR}{\Delta Q} \times \frac{\Delta Q}{\Delta L} = \frac{\Delta TR}{\Delta L}
\end{align}$$

Here:

- $TR$ is the Total Revenue (a money amount).
- $MP$ is the marginal product (units created with the marginal labor time and effort).
- $Q$ is the amount of goods (a measure of the quantity or volume sold).
- $MR$ is marginal revenue (the money revenue received from the marginal product produced).
- $L$ is Labour (amount of labor time or effort).

[This page is incomplete. Please define each and every variable and include their dimension]

The change in output is not limited to that directly attributable to the additional worker. Assuming that the firm is operating with diminishing marginal returns then the addition of an extra worker reduces the average productivity of every other worker (and every other worker affects the marginal productivity of the additional worker).

The firm is modeled as choosing to add units of labor until the $MRP$ equals the wage rate $w$ — mathematically until

$$\begin{align}
MRP_L &= w\\[5pt]
MR(MP_L) &= w\\[5pt]
MR &= \frac{w}{MP_L}\\[5pt]
MR &= MC ,\text{ which is the profit maximizing rule.}
\end{align}$$

== Marginal revenue product in a perfectly competitive market ==
Under perfect competition, marginal revenue product is equal to marginal physical product (extra unit of good produced as a result of a new employment) multiplied by price.

$$\begin{align}
MRP &= MPP \times MR(D=AR=P) \text{ as perfectly competitive labour market}\\[5pt]
MRP &= MPP \times \text{Price}
\end{align}$$

This is because the firm in perfect competition is a price taker. It does not have to lower the price in order to sell additional units of the good.

== MRP in monopoly or imperfect competition ==
Firms operating as monopolies or in imperfect competition face downward-sloping demand curves. To sell extra units of output, they would have to lower their output's price. Under such market conditions, marginal revenue product will not equal $MPP \times \text{Price}$. This is because the firm is not able to sell output at a fixed price per unit. Thus the $MRP$ curve of a firm in monopoly or in imperfect competition will slope downwards, when plotted against labor usage, at a faster rate than in perfect specific competition.
