= Profit maximization =

Process to determine the highest profits for a firm

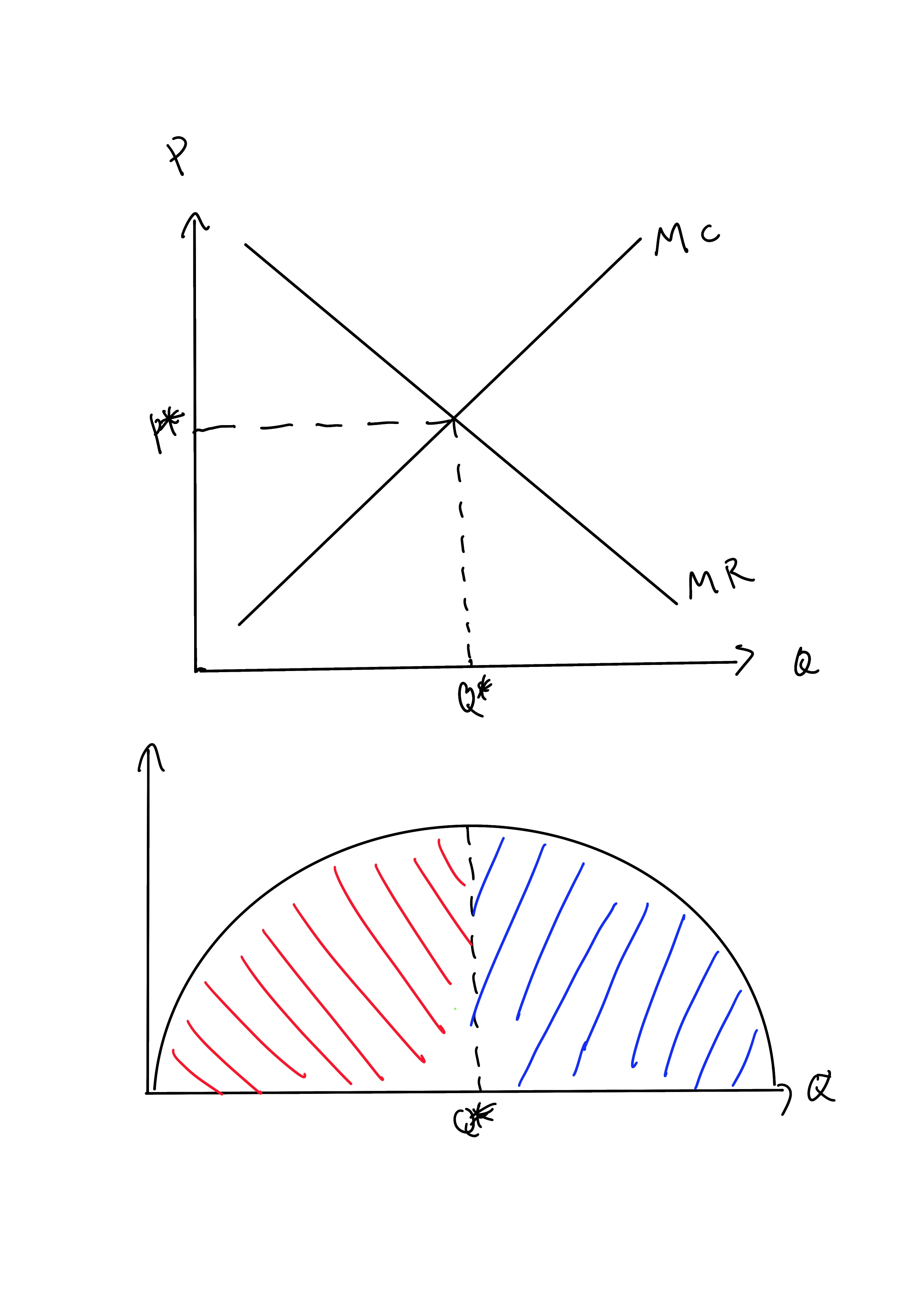
An example diagram of Profit Maximization: In the supply and demand graph, the output of $Q^*$ is the intersection point of $\text{MR}$ (Marginal Revenue) and $\text{MC}$ (Marginal Cost), where $\text{MR}=\text{MC}$. The firm which produces at this output level is said to maximize profits. If the output produced is less than the equilibrium quantity ($Q^*$), as shown in the red part, then $\text{MR}$ is greater than $\text{MC}$ ($\text{MR}>\text{MC}$), and the profit is not maximized. The firm has in its interest to raise its output level to maximize profits, because the revenue gained will be more than the cost to pay. However, if the output level is greater than $Q^*$ ($\text{MR}<\text{MC}$), as shown in the blue part, the firm's overall profit will decrease because the additional unit produced will increase the overall cost. Here too the profit is not maximized and the firm has to lower its output level to maximize profits.

In economics, profit maximization is the short run or long run process by which a firm may determine the price, input and output levels that will lead to the highest possible total profit (or just profit in short). In neoclassical economics, which is currently the mainstream approach to microeconomics, the firm is assumed to be a "rational agent" (whether operating in a perfectly competitive market or otherwise) which wants to maximize its total profit, which is the difference between its total revenue and its total cost.

Measuring the total cost and total revenue is often impractical, as the firms do not have the necessary reliable information to determine costs at all levels of production. Instead, they take more practical approach by examining how small changes in production influence revenues and costs. When a firm produces an extra unit of product, the additional revenue gained from selling it is called the marginal revenue ($\text{MR}$), and the additional cost to produce that unit is called the marginal cost ($\text{MC}$). When the level of output is such that the marginal revenue is equal to the marginal cost ($\text{MR}=\text{MC}$), then the firm's total profit is said to be maximized. If the marginal revenue is greater than the marginal cost ($\text{MR}>\text{MC}$), then its total profit is not maximized, because the firm can produce additional units to earn additional profit. In other words, in this case, it is in the "rational" interest of the firm to increase its output level until its total profit is maximized. On the other hand, if the marginal revenue is less than the marginal cost ($\text{MR}<\text{MC}$), then too its total profit is not maximized, because producing one unit less will reduce total cost more than total revenue gained, thus giving the firm more total profit. In this case, a "rational" firm has an incentive to reduce its output level until its total profit is maximized.

== Primary perspectives ==
There are several perspectives one can take on profit maximization. First, since profit equals revenue minus cost, one can plot graphically each of the variables revenue and cost as functions of the level of output and find the output level that maximizes the difference (or this can be done with a table of values instead of a graph). Second, if specific functional forms are known for revenue and cost in terms of output, one can use calculus to maximize profit with respect to the output level. Third, since the first order condition for the optimization equates marginal revenue and marginal cost, if marginal revenue ($\text{MR}$) and marginal cost ($\text{MC}$) functions in terms of output are directly available one can equate these, using either equations or a graph. Fourth, rather than a function giving the cost of producing each potential output level, the firm may have input cost functions giving the cost of acquiring any amount of each input, along with a production function showing how much output results from using any combination of input quantities. In this case one can use calculus to maximize profit with respect to input usage levels, subject to the input cost functions and the production function. The first order condition for each input equates the marginal revenue product of the input (the increment to revenue from selling the product caused by an increment to the amount of the input used) to the marginal cost of the input.

For a firm in a perfectly competitive market for its output, the revenue function will simply equal the market price times the quantity produced and sold, whereas for a monopolist, which chooses its level of output simultaneously with its selling price. In the case of monopoly, the company will produce more products because it can still make normal profits. To get the most profit, you need to set higher prices and lower quantities than the competitive market. However, the revenue function takes into account the fact that higher levels of output require a lower price in order to be sold. An analogous feature holds for the input markets: in a perfectly competitive input market the firm's cost of the input is simply the amount purchased for use in production times the market-determined unit input cost, whereas a monopsonist’s input price per unit is higher for higher amounts of the input purchased.

The principal difference between short run and long run profit maximization is that in the long run the quantities of all inputs, including physical capital, are choice variables, while in the short run the amount of capital is predetermined by past investment decisions. In either case, there are inputs of labor and raw materials.

== Basic definitions ==
Any costs incurred by a firm may be classified into two groups: fixed costs and variable costs. Fixed costs, which occur only in the short run, are incurred by the business at any level of output, including zero output. These may include equipment maintenance, rent, wages of employees whose numbers cannot be increased or decreased in the short run, and general upkeep. Variable costs change with the level of output, increasing as more product is generated. Materials consumed during production often have the largest impact on this category, which also includes the wages of employees who can be hired and laid off in the short run span of time under consideration. Fixed cost and variable cost, combined, equal total cost.

Revenue is the amount of money that a company receives from its normal business activities, usually from the sale of goods and services (as opposed to monies from security sales such as equity shares or debt issuances).

The five ways formula is to increase leads, conversation rates, average dollar sales, the average number of sales, and average product profit. Profits can be increased by up to 1,000 percent, this is important for sole traders and small businesses let alone big businesses but none the less all profit maximization is a matter of each business stage and greater returns for profit sharing thus higher wages and motivation.

Marginal cost and marginal revenue, depending on whether the calculus approach is taken or not, are defined as either the change in cost or revenue as each additional unit is produced or the derivative of cost or revenue with respect to the quantity of output. For instance, taking the first definition, if it costs a firm $400 to produce 5 units and $480 to produce 6, the marginal cost of the sixth unit is 80 dollars. Conversely, the marginal income from the production of 6 units is the income from the production of 6 units minus the income from the production of 5 units (the latter item minus the preceding item).

== Total revenue – total cost perspective ==
Profit maximization using the total revenue and total cost curves of a perfect competitor

To obtain the profit maximizing output quantity, we start by recognizing that profit is equal to total revenue ($\text{TR}$) minus total cost ($\text{TC}$). Given a table of costs and revenues at each quantity, we can either compute equations or plot the data directly on a graph. The profit-maximizing output is the one at which this difference reaches its maximum.

In the accompanying diagram, the linear total revenue curve represents the case in which the firm is a perfect competitor in the goods market, and thus cannot set its own selling price. The profit-maximizing output level is represented as the one at which total revenue is the height of $\text{C}$ and total cost is the height of $\text{B}$; the maximal profit is measured as the length of the segment $\overline{\text{CB}}$. This output level is also the one at which the total profit curve is at its maximum.

If, contrary to what is assumed in the graph, the firm is not a perfect competitor in the output market, the price to sell the product at can be read off the demand curve at the firm's optimal quantity of output. This optimal quantity of output is the quantity at which marginal revenue equals marginal cost.

== Marginal revenue – marginal cost perspective ==
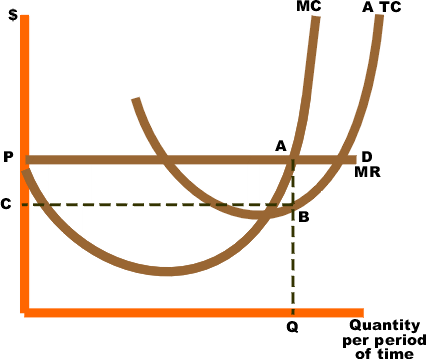
Profit maximization using the marginal revenue and marginal cost curves of a perfect competitor

Price setting by a monopolist

An equivalent perspective relies on the relationship that, for each unit sold, marginal profit ($\text{M}\pi$) equals marginal revenue ($\text{MR}$) minus marginal cost ($\text{MC}$). Then, if marginal revenue is greater than marginal cost at some level of output, marginal profit is positive and thus a greater quantity should be produced, and if marginal revenue is less than marginal cost, marginal profit is negative and a lesser quantity should be produced. At the output level at which marginal revenue equals marginal cost, marginal profit is zero and this quantity is the one that maximizes profit. Since total profit increases when marginal profit is positive and total profit decreases when marginal profit is negative, it must reach a maximum where marginal profit is zero—where marginal cost equals marginal revenue—and where lower or higher output levels give lower profit levels. In calculus terms, the requirement that the optimal output have higher profit than adjacent output levels is that:

$$\frac{\operatorname d^2 R}{{\operatorname dQ}^2} < \frac{\operatorname d^2 C}{{\operatorname dQ}^2}.$$

The intersection of $\text{MR}$ and $\text{MC}$ is shown in the next diagram as point $\text{A}$. If the industry is perfectly competitive (as is assumed in the diagram), the firm faces a demand curve ($\text{D}$) that is identical to its marginal revenue curve ($\text{MR}$), and this is a horizontal line at a price determined by industry supply and demand. Average total costs are represented by curve $\text{ATC}$. Total economic profit is represented by the area of the rectangle $\overline{\text{PABC}}$. The optimum quantity ($Q$) is the same as the optimum quantity in the first diagram.

If the firm is a monopolist, the marginal revenue curve would have a negative slope as shown in the next graph, because it would be based on the downward-sloping market demand curve. The optimal output, shown in the graph as $Q_m$, is the level of output at which marginal cost equals marginal revenue. The price that induces that quantity of output is the height of the demand curve at that quantity (denoted $P_m$).

A generic derivation of the profit maximisation level of output is given by the following steps. Firstly, suppose a representative firm $i$ has perfect information about its profit, given by:

$$\pi_i=\text{TR}_i-\text{TC}_i$$

where $\text{TR}$ denotes total revenue and $\text{TC}$ denotes total costs. The above expression can be re-written as:

$$\pi_i=p_i\cdot q_i-c_i\cdot q_i$$

where $p$ denotes price (marginal revenue), $q$ quantity, and $c$ marginal cost. The firm maximises their profit with respect to quantity to yield the profit maximisation level of output:

$$\frac{\left(\partial\pi_i\right)}{\left(\partial q_i\right)}=p_i-c_i=0$$

As such, the profit maximisation level of output is marginal revenue $p_i$ equating to marginal cost $c_i$.

In an environment that is competitive but not perfectly so, more complicated profit maximization solutions involve the use of game theory.

== Case in which maximizing revenue is equivalent ==
In some cases a firm's demand and cost conditions are such that marginal profits are greater than zero for all levels of production up to a certain maximum. In this case marginal profit plunges to zero immediately after that maximum is reached; hence the $\text{M}\pi = 0$ rule implies that output should be produced at the maximum level, which also happens to be the level that maximizes revenue. In other words, the profit-maximizing quantity and price can be determined by setting marginal revenue equal to zero, which occurs at the maximal level of output. Marginal revenue equals zero when the total revenue curve has reached its maximum value. An example would be a scheduled airline flight. The marginal costs of flying one more passenger on the flight are negligible until all the seats are filled. The airline would maximize profit by filling all the seats.

== Maximizing profits in the real world ==
Shareholder primacy pushes corporations to maximize profits for shareholders above other stakeholders.

In the real world, it is not easy to achieve profit maximization. The company must accurately know the marginal income and the marginal cost of the last commodity sold because of MR.

The price elasticity of demand for goods depends on the response of other companies. When it is the only company raising prices, demand will be elastic. If one family raises prices and others follow, demand may be inelastic.

Companies can seek to maximize profits through estimation. When the price increase leads to a small decline in demand, the company can increase the price as much as possible before the demand becomes elastic. Generally, it is difficult to change the impact of the price according to the demand, because the demand may occur due to many other factors besides the price.

The company may also have other goals and considerations. For example, companies may choose to earn less than the maximum profit in pursuit of higher market share. Because price increases maximize profits in the short term, they will attract more companies to enter the market.

Many companies try to minimize costs by shifting production to foreign locations with cheap labor (e.g. Nike, Inc.). However, moving the production line to a foreign location may cause unnecessary transportation costs. Close market locations for producing and selling products can improve demand optimization, but when the production cost is much higher, it is not a good choice.

=== Tools ===
Profit analysis
Habitually recording and analyzing the business costs of all products/services sold. There are many miscellaneous items in the cost including labor, materials, transportation, advertising, storage, etc. related to any goods or services sold, which become expenses.
Business intelligence tools
may be needed to integrate all financial information to record expense reports so that the business can clearly understand all costs related to operations and their accuracy.
Planning and actual execution
when implementing a "what if" solution to help in sales and operation planning process, familiarity with the company's operations, including the supply chain, inventory management and sales process is useful. Constraints are required to prevent corporate plans from becoming unfeasible.

== Changes in total costs and profit maximization ==
A firm maximizes profit by operating where marginal revenue equals marginal cost. This is stipulated under neoclassical theory, in which a firm maximizes profit in order to determine a level of output and inputs, which provides the price equals marginal cost condition. In the short run, a change in fixed costs has no effect on the profit maximizing output or price. The firm merely treats short term fixed costs as sunk costs and continues to operate as before. This can be confirmed graphically. Using the diagram illustrating the total cost–total revenue perspective, the firm maximizes profit at the point where the slopes of the total cost line and total revenue line are equal. An increase in fixed cost would cause the total cost curve to shift up rigidly by the amount of the change. There would be no effect on the total revenue curve or the shape of the total cost curve. Consequently, the profit maximizing output would remain the same. This point can also be illustrated using the diagram for the marginal revenue–marginal cost perspective. A change in fixed cost would have no effect on the position or shape of these curves. In simple terms, although profit is related to total cost, $\text{Profit} = \text{TR}-\text{TC}$, the enterprise can maximize profit by producing to the maximum profit (the maximum value of $\text{TR}-\text{TC}$) to maximize profit. But when the total cost increases, it does not mean maximizing profit Will change, because the increase in total cost does not necessarily change the marginal cost. If the marginal cost remains the same, the enterprise can still produce to the unit of ($\text{MR}=\text{MC}=\text{Price}$) to maximize profit. In the long run, a firm will theoretically have zero expected profits under the competitive equilibrium. The market should adjust to clear any profits if there is perfect competition. In situations where there are non-zero profits, we should expect to see either some form of long run disequilibrium or non-competitive conditions, such as barriers to entry, where there is not perfect competition between firms.

== Markup pricing ==
In addition to using methods to determine a firm's optimal level of output, a firm that is not perfectly competitive can equivalently set price to maximize profit (since setting price along a given demand curve involves picking a preferred point on that curve, which is equivalent to picking a preferred quantity to produce and sell). The profit maximization conditions can be expressed in a "more easily applicable" form or rule of thumb than the above perspectives use. The first step is to rewrite the expression for marginal revenue as

$$\begin{align}
\text{MR} =  & \frac{\Delta \text{TR}}{\Delta Q} \\
= & \frac{P\Delta Q+Q \Delta P}{\Delta Q} \\
= & P+\frac{Q \Delta P}{\Delta Q} \\
\end{align}$$

, where $P$ and $Q$ refer to the midpoints between the old and new values of price and quantity respectively. The marginal revenue from an incremental unit of output has two parts: first, the revenue the firm gains from selling the additional units or, giving the term $P\Delta Q$. The additional units are called the marginal units. Producing one extra unit and selling it at price $P$ brings in revenue of $P$. Moreover, one must consider "the revenue the firm loses on the units it could have sold at the higher price"—that is, if the price of all units had not been pulled down by the effort to sell more units. These units that have lost revenue are called the infra-marginal units. That is, selling the extra unit results in a small drop in price which reduces the revenue for all units sold by the amount $Q \cdot \left( \frac{\Delta P}{\Delta Q}\right)$. Thus, $\text{MR} = P + Q \cdot \frac{\Delta P}{\Delta Q} = P + P \cdot \frac{Q}{P} \cdot \frac{\Delta P}{\Delta Q} = P + \frac{P}{\text{PED}}$, where $\text{PED}$ is the price elasticity of demand characterizing the demand curve of the firms' customers, which is negative. Then setting $\text{MC} = \text{MR}$ gives $\text{MC} = P + \frac{P}{\text{PED}}$ so $\frac{P - \text{MC}}{P} = \frac{-1}{\text{PED}}$ and $P = \frac{MC}{1 + \left(\frac{1}{\text{PED}}\right)}$. Thus, the optimal markup rule is:

$$\frac{\left( P - \text{MC} \right)}{P} = \frac{1}{\left( -\text{PED}\right)}$$

or equivalently

$P = \frac{\text{PED}}{1 + \text{PED}} \cdot \text{MC}$.

In other words, the rule is that the size of the markup of price over the marginal cost is inversely related to the absolute value of the price elasticity of demand for the good.

The optimal markup rule also implies that a non-competitive firm will produce on the elastic region of its market demand curve. Marginal cost is positive. The term $\frac{PED}{1+\text{PED}}$ would be positive so $P>0$ only if $\text{PED}$ is between $-1$ and $-\infty$ (that is, if demand is elastic at that level of output). The intuition behind this result is that, if demand is inelastic at some value $Q_1$ then a decrease in $Q$ would increase $P$ more than proportionately, thereby increasing revenue $P \cdot Q$; since lower $Q$ would also lead to lower total cost, profit would go up due to the combination of increased revenue and decreased cost. Thus, $Q_1$ does not give the highest possible profit.

== Marginal product of labor, marginal revenue product of labor, and profit maximization ==
The general rule is that the firm maximizes profit by producing that quantity of output where marginal revenue equals marginal cost. The profit maximization issue can also be approached from the input side. That is, what is the profit maximizing usage of the variable input? To maximize profit the firm should increase usage of the input "up to the point where the input's marginal revenue product equals its marginal costs". Mathematically, the profit-maximizing rule is $\text{MRP}_L = \text{MC}_L$, where the subscript $_L$ refers to the commonly assumed variable input, labor.

The marginal revenue product is the change in total revenue per unit change in the variable input, that is, $\text{MRP}_L = \frac{\Delta \text{TR}}{\Delta L}$.

$\text{MRP}_L$ is the product of marginal revenue and the marginal product of labor or $\text{MRP}_L = \text{MR} \cdot \text{MP}_L$.

== Criticism ==
The maximization of producer surplus can in some cases reduce consumer surplus. Some forms of producer profit maximization are considered anti-competitive practices and are regulated by competition law. Maximization of short-term producer profit can reduce long-term producer profit, which can be exploited by predatory pricing such as dumping.

== Government Regulation ==
Market quotas reflect the power of a firm in the market, a firm dominating a market is very common, and too much power often becomes the motive for non-Hong behavior. Predatory pricing, tying, price gouging and other behaviors are reflecting the crisis of excessive power of monopolists in the market. In an attempt to prevent businesses from abusing their power to maximize their own profits, governments often intervene to stop them in their tracks. A major example of this is through anti-trust regulation which effectively outlaws most industry monopolies. Through this regulation, consumers enjoy a better relationship with the companies that serve them, even though the company itself may suffer, financially speaking.

== See also ==
- Utility maximization problem
- Welfare maximization
- Business organization
- Corporation
- Duality (optimization)
- Market structure
- Microeconomics
- Pricing
- Outline of industrial organization
- Rational choice theory
- Supply and demand
- Marginal revenue
- Total revenue
- Marginal cost
- Enshittification
