= Marginal cost =

Cost added by producing one additional unit of a product or service

In economics, marginal cost (MC) is the change in the total cost that arises when the quantity produced is increased, i.e. the cost of producing additional quantity. In some contexts, it refers to an increment of one unit of output, and in others it refers to the rate of change of total cost as output is increased by an infinitesimal amount. Marginal cost is different from average cost, which is the total cost divided by the number of units produced.

At each level of production and time period being considered, marginal cost includes all costs that vary with the level of production, whereas costs that do not vary with production are fixed. For example, the marginal cost of producing an automobile will include the costs of labor and parts needed for the additional automobile but not the fixed cost of the factory building, which does not change with output. The marginal cost can be either short-run or long-run marginal cost, depending on what costs vary with output, since in the long run even building size is chosen to fit the desired output.

If the cost function $C$ is continuous and differentiable, the marginal cost $MC$ is the first derivative of the cost function with respect to the output quantity $Q$:

$$MC(Q) = \frac{\ dC}{\ dQ}.$$

If the cost function is not differentiable, the marginal cost can be expressed as follows:

$$MC = \frac{\Delta C}{\Delta Q},$$

where $\Delta$ denotes an incremental change of one unit.

== Short run marginal cost ==
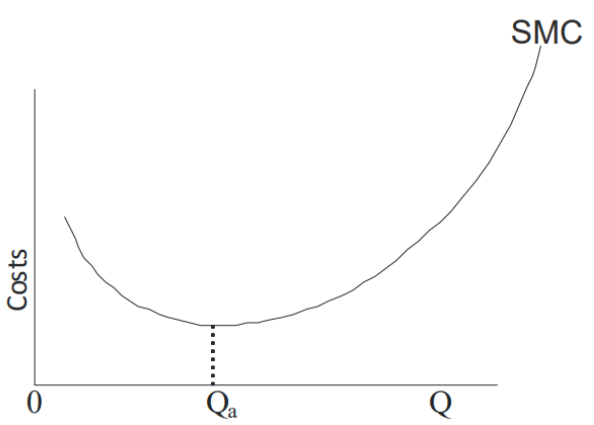
Short Run Marginal Cost

Short run marginal cost is the change in total cost when an additional output is produced in the short run and some costs are fixed. On the right side of the page, the short-run marginal cost forms a U-shape, with quantity on the x-axis and cost per unit on the y-axis.

On the short run, the firm has some costs that are fixed independently of the quantity of output (e.g. buildings, machinery). Other costs such as labor and materials vary with output, and thus show up in marginal cost. The marginal cost may first decline, as in the diagram, if the additional cost per unit is high, if the firm operates at too low a level of output, or it may start flat or rise immediately. At some point, the marginal cost rises as increases in the variable inputs such as labor put increasing pressure on the fixed assets such as the size of the building. In the long run, the firm would increase its fixed assets to correspond to the desired output; the short run is defined as the period in which those assets cannot be changed.

== Long run marginal cost ==
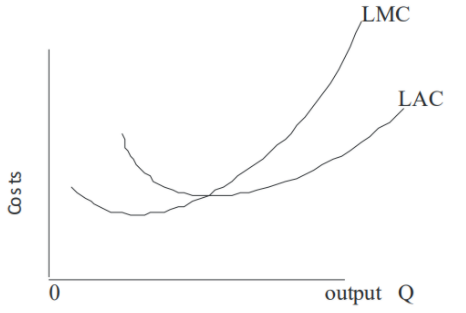
Long Run Marginal Cost

The long run is defined as the length of time in which no input is fixed. Everything, including building size and machinery, can be chosen optimally for the quantity of output that is desired. As a result, even if short-run marginal cost rises because of capacity constraints, long-run marginal cost can be constant. Or, there may be increasing or decreasing returns to scale if technological or management productivity changes with the quantity. Or, there may be both, as in the diagram at the right, in which the marginal cost first falls (increasing returns to scale) and then rises (decreasing returns to scale).

== Cost functions and relationship to average cost ==
In the simplest case, the total cost function and its derivative are expressed as follows, where Q represents the production quantity, VC represents variable costs, FC represents fixed costs, and TC represents total costs.

Fixed costs represent the costs that do not change as the production quantity changes. Fixed costs are costs incurred by things like rent, building space, machines, etc. Variable costs change as the production quantity changes, and are often associated with labor or materials. The derivative of fixed cost is zero, and this term drops out of the marginal cost equation: that is, marginal cost does not depend on fixed costs. This can be compared with average total cost (ATC), which is the total cost (including fixed costs, denoted C_{0}) divided by the number of units produced:

$$ATC=\frac{C_0 + \Delta C}{Q}.$$

For discrete calculation without calculus, marginal cost equals the change in total (or variable) cost that comes with each additional unit produced. Since fixed cost does not change in the short run, it has no effect on marginal cost.

For instance, suppose the total cost of making 1 shoe is $30 and the total cost of making 2 shoes is $40. The marginal cost of producing shoes decreases from $30 to $10 with the production of the second shoe ($40 – $30 = $10). In another example, when a fixed cost is associated, the marginal cost can be calculated as presented in the table below.

Marginal Cost Example
Output (units)	Total Cost	Average Cost	Marginal Cost
0	10 (Fixed Cost)	∞	–
1	30	30	20
2	40	20	10
3	48	16	8

Marginal cost is not the cost of producing the "next" or "last" unit. The cost of the last unit is the same as the cost of the first unit and every other unit. In the short run, increasing production requires using more of the variable input — conventionally assumed to be labor. Adding more labor to a fixed capital stock reduces the marginal product of labor because of the diminishing marginal returns. This reduction in productivity is not limited to the additional labor needed to produce the marginal unit – the productivity of every unit of labor is reduced. Thus the cost of producing the marginal unit of output has two components: the cost associated with producing the marginal unit and the increase in average costs for all units produced due to the "damage" to the entire productive process. The first component is the per-unit or average cost. The second component is the small increase in cost due to the law of diminishing marginal returns which increases the costs of all units sold.

Marginal costs can also be expressed as the cost per unit of labor divided by the marginal product of labor. Denoting variable cost as VC, the constant wage rate as w, and labor usage as L, we have

$$MC = \frac{\Delta VC}{\Delta Q}$$
$$\Delta VC = {w \Delta L}$$

$$MC = \frac{w \Delta L}{\Delta Q}=\frac{w}{MPL}.$$

Here MPL is the ratio of increase in the quantity produced per unit increase in labour: i.e. ΔQ/ΔL, the marginal product of labor. The last equality holds because $\frac{\Delta L}{\Delta Q}$ is the change in quantity of labor that brings about a one-unit change in output. Since the wage rate is assumed constant, marginal cost and marginal product of labor have an inverse relationship—if the marginal product of labor is decreasing (or, increasing), then marginal cost is increasing (decreasing), and AVC = VC/Q=wL/Q = w/(Q/L) = w/AP_{L}

== Empirical data on marginal cost ==
While neoclassical models broadly assume that marginal cost will increase as production increases, several empirical studies conducted throughout the 20th century have concluded that the marginal cost is either constant or falling for the vast majority of firms. Most recently, former Federal Reserve Vice-Chair Alan Blinder and colleagues conducted a survey of 200 executives of corporations with sales exceeding $10 million, in which they were asked, among other questions, about the structure of their marginal cost curves. Strikingly, just 11% of respondents answered that their marginal costs increased as production increased, while 48% answered that they were constant, and 41% answered that they were decreasing. Summing up the results, they wrote:

...many more companies state that they have falling, rather than rising, marginal cost curves. While there are reasons to wonder whether respondents interpreted these questions about costs correctly, their answers paint an image of the cost structure of the typical firm that is very different from the one immortalized in textbooks.

— Asking About Prices: A New Approach to Understanding Price Stickiness, p. 105

Many Post-Keynesian economists have pointed to these results as evidence in favor of their own heterodox theories of the firm, which generally assume that marginal cost is constant as production increases.

== Economies of scale ==
Economies of scale apply to the long run, a span of time in which all inputs can be varied by the firm so that there are no fixed inputs or fixed costs. Production may be subject to economies of scale (or diseconomies of scale). Economies of scale are said to exist if an additional unit of output can be produced for less than the average of all previous units – that is, if long-run marginal cost is below long-run average cost, so the latter is falling. Conversely, there may be levels of production where marginal cost is higher than average cost, and the average cost is an increasing function of output. Where there are economies of scale, prices set at marginal cost will fail to cover total costs, thus requiring a subsidy. For this generic case, minimum average cost occurs at the point where average cost and marginal cost are equal (when plotted, the marginal cost curve intersects the average cost curve from below).

== Perfectly competitive supply curve ==
The portion of the marginal cost curve above its intersection with the average variable cost curve is the supply curve for a firm operating in a perfectly competitive market (the portion of the MC curve below its intersection with the AVC curve is not part of the supply curve because a firm would not operate at a price below the shutdown point). This is not true for firms operating in other market structures. For example, while a monopoly has an MC curve, it does not have a supply curve. In a perfectly competitive market, a supply curve shows the quantity a seller is willing and able to supply at each price – for each price, there is a unique quantity that would be supplied.

== Decisions taken based on marginal costs ==
In perfectly competitive markets, firms decide the quantity to be produced based on marginal costs and sale price. If the sale price is higher than the marginal cost, then they produce the unit and supply it. If the marginal cost is higher than the price, it would not be profitable to produce it. So the production will be carried out until the marginal cost is equal to the sale price.

== Relationship to fixed costs ==
Marginal costs are not affected by the level of fixed cost. Marginal costs can be expressed as ∆C/∆Q. Since fixed costs do not vary with (depend on) changes in quantity, MC is ∆VC/∆Q. Thus if fixed cost were to double, the marginal cost MC would not be affected, and consequently, the profit-maximizing quantity and price would not change. This can be illustrated by graphing the short run total cost curve and the short-run variable cost curve. The shapes of the curves are identical. Each curve initially increases at a decreasing rate, reaches an inflection point, then increases at an increasing rate. The only difference between the curves is that the SRVC curve begins from the origin while the SRTC curve originates on the positive part of the vertical axis. The distance of the beginning point of the SRTC above the origin represents the fixed cost – the vertical distance between the curves. This distance remains constant as the quantity produced, Q, increases. MC is the slope of the SRVC curve. A change in fixed cost would be reflected by a change in the vertical distance between the SRTC and SRVC curve. Any such change would have no effect on the shape of the SRVC curve and therefore its slope MC at any point. The changing law of marginal cost is similar to the changing law of average cost. They are both decrease at first with the increase of output, then start to increase after reaching a certain scale. While the output when marginal cost reaches its minimum is smaller than the average total cost and average variable cost. When the average total cost and the average variable cost reach their lowest point, the marginal cost is equal to the average cost.

== Private versus social marginal cost ==
Of great importance in the theory of marginal cost is the distinction between the marginal private and social costs. The marginal private cost shows the cost borne by the firm in question. It is the marginal private cost that is used by business decision makers in their profit maximization behavior. Marginal social cost is similar to private cost in that it includes the cost of private enterprise but also any other cost (or offsetting benefit) to parties having no direct association with purchase or sale of the product. It incorporates all negative and positive externalities, of both production and consumption. Examples include a social cost from air pollution affecting third parties and a social benefit from flu shots protecting others from infection.

Externalities are costs (or benefits) that are not borne by the parties to the economic transaction. A producer may, for example, pollute the environment, and others may bear those costs. A consumer may consume a good which produces benefits for society, such as education; because the individual does not receive all of the benefits, he may consume less than efficiency would suggest. Alternatively, an individual may be a smoker or alcoholic and impose costs on others. In these cases, production or consumption of the good in question may differ from the optimum level.

=== Negative externalities of production ===
Negative Externalities of Production

Much of the time, private and social costs do not diverge from one another, but at times social costs may be either greater or less than private costs. When the marginal social cost of production is greater than that of the private cost function, there is a negative externality of production. Productive processes that result in pollution or other environmental waste are textbook examples of production that creates negative externalities.

Such externalities are a result of firms externalizing their costs onto a third party in order to reduce their own total cost. As a result of externalizing such costs, we see that members of society who are not included in the firm will be negatively affected by such behavior of the firm. In this case, an increased cost of production in society creates a social cost curve that depicts a greater cost than the private cost curve.

In an equilibrium state, markets creating negative externalities of production will overproduce that good. As a result, the socially optimal production level would be lower than that observed.

=== Positive externalities of production ===
Positive Externalities of Production

When the marginal social cost of production is less than that of the private cost function, there is a positive externality of production. Production of public goods is a textbook example of production that creates positive externalities. An example of such a public good, which creates a divergence in social and private costs, is the production of education. It is often seen that education is a positive for any whole society, as well as a positive for those directly involved in the market.

Such production creates a social cost curve that is below the private cost curve. In an equilibrium state, markets creating positive externalities of production will underproduce their good. As a result, the socially optimal production level would be greater than that observed.

== Relationship between marginal cost and average total cost ==
The marginal cost intersects with the average total cost and the average variable cost at their lowest point. Take the [Relationship between marginal cost and average total cost] graph as a representation.

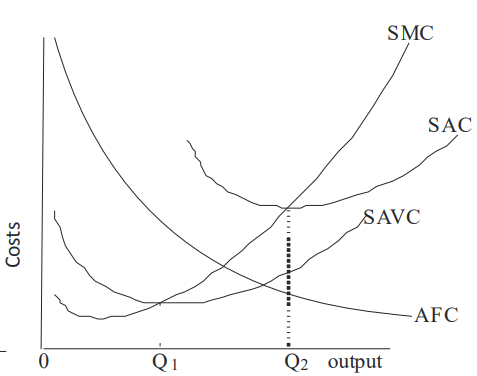
Relationship between marginal cost and average total cost

Say the starting point of level of output produced is n. Marginal cost is the change of the total cost from an additional output [(n+1)th unit]. Therefore, (refer to "Average cost" labelled picture on the right side of the screen.

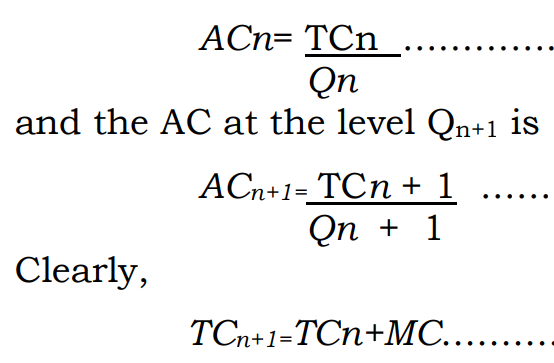
Average cost

In this case, when the marginal cost of the (n+1)th unit is less than the average cost(n), the average cost (n+1) will get a smaller value than average cost(n). It goes the opposite way when the marginal cost of (n+1)th is higher than average cost(n). In this case, The average cost(n+1) will be higher than average cost(n). If the marginal cost is found lying under the average cost curve, it will bend the average cost curve downwards and if the marginal cost is above the average cost curve, it will bend the average cost curve upwards. You can see the table above where before the marginal cost curve and the average cost curve intersect, the average cost curve is downwards sloping, however after the intersection, the average cost curve is sloping upwards. The U-shape graph reflects the law of diminishing returns. A firm can only produce so much but after the production of (n+1)th output reaches a minimum cost, the output produced after will only increase the average total cost (Nwokoye, Ebele & Ilechukwu, Nneamaka, 2018).

== Profit maximization ==
The profit maximizing graph represents optimal production quantity when both marginal cost and the marginal profit line intercepts. The black line represents the intersection where the profits are the greatest (marginal revenue = marginal cost). The left side of the black vertical line marked as "profit-maximising quantity" is where the marginal revenue is larger than marginal cost. If a firm sets its production on the left side of the graph and decides to increase the output, the additional revenue per output obtained will exceed the additional cost per output. From the "profit maximizing graph", we could observe that the revenue covers both bar A and B, meanwhile the cost only covers B. Of course A+B earns you a profit but the increase in output to the point of MR=MC yields extra profit that can cover the revenue for the missing A. The firm is recommended to increase output to reach (Theory and Applications of Microeconomics, 2012).

On the other hand, the right side of the black line (Marginal revenue = marginal cost), shows that marginal cost is more than marginal revenue. Suppose a firm sets its output on this side, if it reduces the output, the cost will decrease from C and D which exceeds the decrease in revenue which is D. Therefore, decreasing output until the point of (marginal revenue=marginal cost) will lead to an increase in profit (Theory and Applications of Microeconomics, 2012).

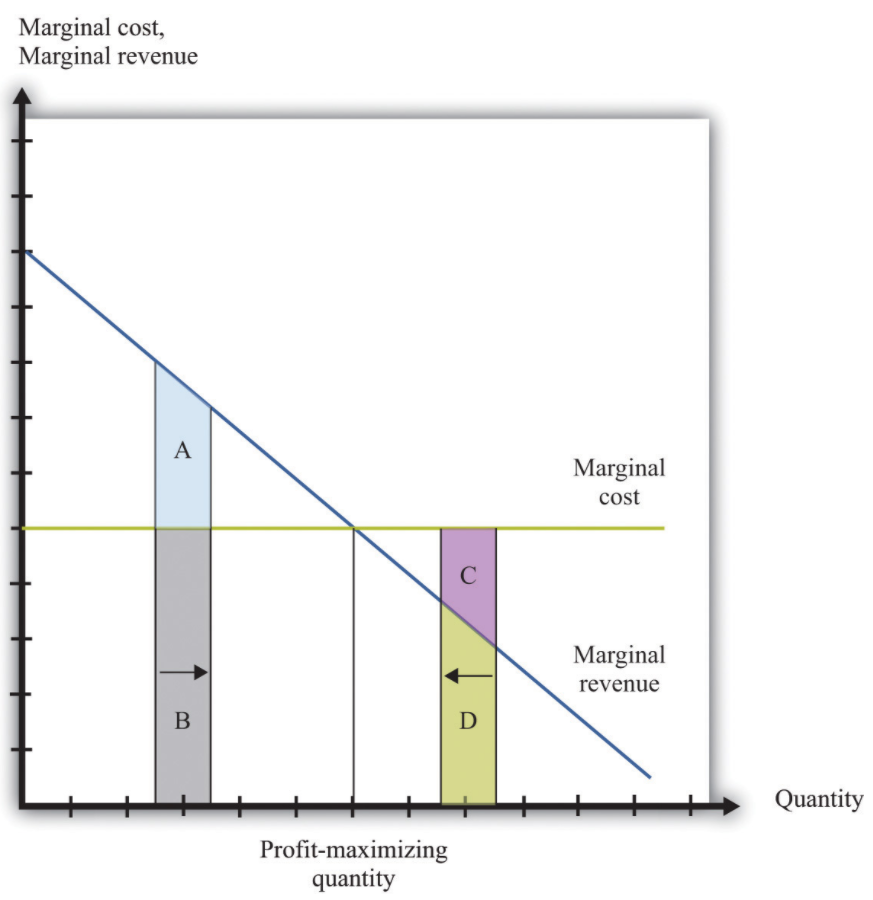
Profit Maximizing Graph

== See also ==
- Average cost
- Break even analysis
- Cost
- Cost curve
- Cost-Volume-Profit Analysis
- Cost-sharing mechanism
- Economic surplus
- Marginal concepts
- Marginal factor cost
- Marginal product of labor
- Marginal revenue
- Merit goods
