= Cost (disambiguation) =

Cost is the value of money that has been used to produce something and is therefore no longer available.

Cost may also refer to:

== Economics ==
- Economic cost, an overview of cost in the field of economics
  - Opportunity cost, the cost of something measured by the inability to spend the money elsewhere
  - Historical cost, also known as accounting cost, the original value of an economic item
  - Variable cost, costs of doing business that increase or decrease with the amount of revenue, such as labor and fuel
  - Fixed cost, costs of doing business that do not change, such as rent and administration
  - Total cost, fixed plus variable cost
  - Average cost, the total cost of production divided by the number of items produced
    - Average fixed cost
    - Average variable cost
  - Marginal cost, the decrease in costs resulting from producing more items
  - Cost curve, a graph of the cost of production as a function of the number of items produced
- Harberger Tax, also known as Common Ownership Self-assessed Tax (COST)

== Other uses ==
- Cost, Texas, an unincorporated community in the United States
- Biological cost
- Court costs
  - Costs (English law)
- Costs (album), a 2011 album from Gideon
- European Cooperation in Science and Technology, abbreviated COST, a European intergovernmental organization
- Costco NASDAQ ticker symbol
- The Cost (album), the sixth studio album by The Frames
- The Cost (band), an American punk rock group
- "The Cost" (The Wire), a 2002 television episode
- The Cost (1920 film), an American silent drama film
- The Cost (2022 film), an Australian revenge drama film
