= Man-hour =

Unit for the amount of work performed by the average worker in one hour

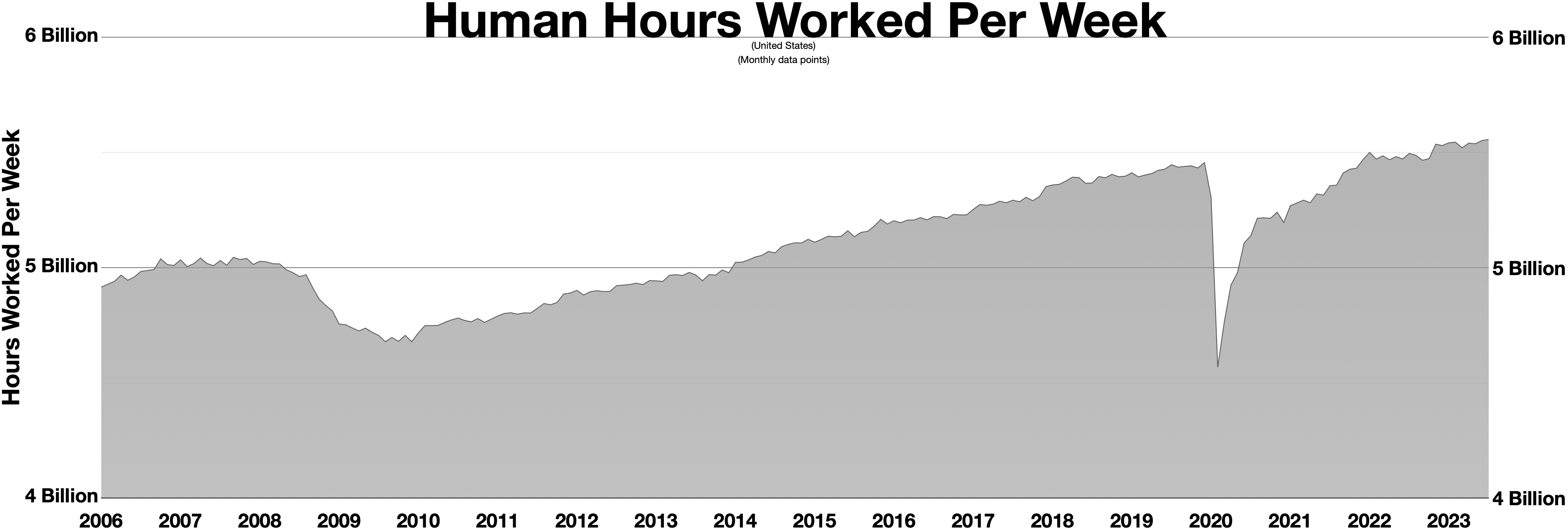
Hours worked per week in the United States, from 2006 to 2023

A man-hour or human-hour is the amount of work performed by the average worker in one hour. It is used for estimation of the total amount of uninterrupted labor required to perform a task. For example, researching and writing a college paper might require eighty man-hours, while preparing a family banquet from scratch might require ten man-hours. The number of man-hours can be increased either by increasing the number of persons working at the same time or increasing the number of hours in work.

Man-hours exclude the breaks that people generally require from work, e.g. for rest, eating, and other bodily functions. They count only pure labor. Managers count the man-hours and add break time to estimate the amount of time a task will actually take to complete. Thus, while one college course's written paper might require twenty man-hours to carry out, it almost certainly will not get done in twenty consecutive hours. Its progress will be interrupted by work for other courses, meals, sleep, and other human necessities.

== Real-world applications ==
The advantage of the man-hour concept is that it can be used to estimate the impact of staff changes on the amount of time required for a task, which can be done by dividing the number of man-hours by the number of workers available. For example, if a task takes 20 man-hours to complete then a team of 2 people will complete it in 10 hours of work, while a team of 5 people will complete it in 4 hours.

This is, of course, only appropriate to certain types of activities. It is of most use when considering 'piece-work', where the activity being managed consists of discrete activities having simple dependencies, and where other factors can be neglected. Therefore, adding another person to a packaging team will increase the output of that team in a predictable manner. In the transport industry, this concept is superseded by passenger-mile and tonne-mile for better costing accuracy.

In reality, other factors intervene to complicate this model. If some elements of the task have a natural timespan, adding more staff will have a reduced effect: although having two chefs will double the speed of some elements of food preparation, they roast a chicken no faster than one chef. Some tasks also have a natural number of staff associated with them: the time to chop the vegetables will be halved with the addition of the second chef, but the time to carve the chicken will remain the same. Economies of scale and diseconomies of scale further lead to a non-linear relationship between the number of workers doing a given task and the amount of time it takes them to complete it. Some tasks cannot be done by fewer than a required minimum number of workers (e.g. lifting heavy loads) or they will be done with drastically better efficiency if the workforce exceeds a minimum efficient scale. In other cases an excessive number of workers might get in each other's way, reducing efficiency and the per person productivity of the individual worker.

Another example is the adage, "Just because a woman can make a baby in nine months, it does not follow that nine women can make a baby in one month." This adage is often cited in systems development to justify the belief that adding more staff to a project does not guarantee it will get done quicker.

Another problem with this model, as Fred Brooks noted, is that organization, training, and coordination activities could more than outweigh the potential benefits of adding extra staff to work on a task, especially if considered only over a shorter time period.

== Similar units ==
The similar concept of a man-day, man-week, man-month, or man-year is used on large projects. It is the amount of work performed by an average worker during one day, week, month, or year, respectively. The number of hours worked by an individual during a year varies greatly according to cultural norms and economics. The average annual hours actually worked per person in employment as reported by OECD countries in 2007, for example, ranged from a minimum of 1,389 hours (in the Netherlands) to a maximum of 2,316 hours (in South Korea).

== Productive system hours ==
The concept of productive system hours (PSH) has been used in forestry in Austria and by extension in other work. It includes time for breaks and can be used to calculate how long it may take to complete a task, including required recovery times from physically strenuous work, as well as legally required breaks or other human interactions. If it includes 15-minute breaks, it is written as (PSH15).

A related concept is productive machine hours (PMH).

== See also ==
- Henry Gantt
- Frank Bunker Gilbreth, Sr.
- Frederick Winslow Taylor
- Labor economics
- Mechanization
- Productivity
- Scientific management
- Surplus value
- The Mythical Man-Month – classic book on software engineering by Fred Brooks
- Time and motion study

== Sources ==
- The Principles of Scientific Management F.W.Taylor, 1911, online
- Taylor, F.W. (1911). Shop Management.
- A Selection from Frederick Taylor's Essays, online
