= Shutdown (economics) =

Halting output when costs are excessive

A firm will choose to implement a shutdown of production when the revenue received from the sale of the goods or services produced cannot even cover the variable costs of production. In that situation, the firm will experience a higher loss when it produces, compared to not producing at all.

Technically, shutdown occurs if average revenue is below average variable cost at the profit-maximizing positive level of output. Producing anything would not generate enough revenue to offset the associated variable costs; producing some output would add further costs in excess of revenues to the costs inevitably being incurred (the fixed costs). By not producing, the firm loses only the fixed costs.

== Explanation ==
The goal of a firm is to maximize profits or minimize losses. The firm can achieve this goal by following two rules. First, the firm should operate, if at all, at the level of output where marginal revenue equals marginal cost. Second, the firm should shut down rather than operate if it can reduce losses by doing so.

=== The shutdown rule ===
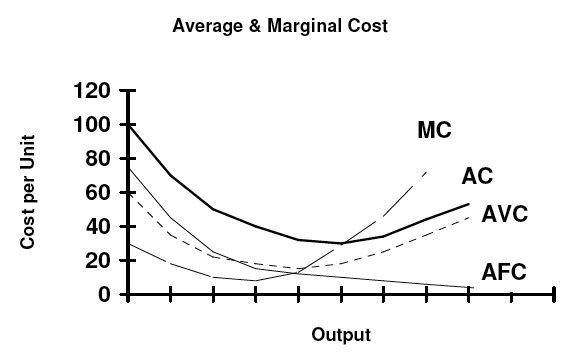
Average Variable Cost (AVC), Average Total (Fixed plus Variable) Cost (AC), Average Fixed Cost (AFC), marginal cost (MC). The short-run optimal quantity of output occurs where marginal cost intersects marginal revenue (not shown; horizontal for a perfect competitor, otherwise downward sloped). If at this output level the height of the average revenue curve (not shown; horizontal for a perfect competitor, otherwise downward sloped) is less than the height of the average variable cost curve, the firm will shut down production of the good in the short run to avoid negative profit.

The optimal quantity of output for the perfect competitor is where marginal cost (MC) equals marginal revenue (MR). In the case depicted, since at this quantity of output average revenue (AR) exceeds average variable cost (not shown, but below average total cost (ATC)), the firm in this situation does not shut down.

Generally, a firm must have revenue $R \ge TC$, total costs, in order to avoid losses. However, in the short run, all fixed costs are sunk costs. Netting out fixed costs, a firm then faces the requirement that $R \ge VC$ (total revenue equals or exceeds variable costs), in order to continue operating. Thus, a firm will find it profitable in the short run to operate so long as the market price equals or exceeds average variable cost (p ≥ AVC). Conventionally stated, the shutdown rule is: "in the short run a firm should continue to operate if price equals or exceeds average variable costs." Restated, the rule is that to produce in the short run a firm must earn sufficient revenue to cover its variable costs. The rationale for the rule is straightforward. By shutting down, a firm avoids all variable costs. However, the firm must still pay fixed costs. Because fixed costs must be paid regardless of whether a firm operates they should not be considered in deciding whether to produce or shut down.

Thus in determining whether to shut down a firm should compare total revenue to total variable costs (VC) rather than total costs (FC (fixed costs) + VC). If the revenue the firm is receiving is greater than its variable cost (R > VC) then the firm is covering all variable cost plus there is additional revenue which partially or entirely offsets fixed costs. (The size of the fixed costs is irrelevant as it is a sunk cost. The same consideration is used whether fixed costs are one dollar or one million dollars.) On the other hand if VC > R then the firm is not even covering its short-run production costs and it should immediately shut down. The rule is conventionally stated in terms of price (average revenue) and average variable costs. The rules are equivalent—if one divides both sides of inequality TR > VC (total revenue exceeds variable costs) by the output quantity Q one obtains P > AVC (price exceeds average variable cost). If the firm decides to operate it will produce where marginal revenue equals marginal costs because these conditions insure profit maximization (or equivalently, when profit is negative, loss minimization).

Another way to state the rule is that a firm should compare the profits from operating to those realized if it shut down, and select the option that produces the greater profit (positive or negative). A firm that is shut down is generating zero revenue and incurring no variable costs. However the firm still incurs fixed cost. So the firm’s profit equals the negative of fixed costs or (–FC). An operating firm is generating revenue, incurring variable costs and paying fixed costs. The operating firm's profit is R – VC – FC . The firm should continue to operate if R – VC – FC ≥ –FC which simplified is R ≥ VC. The difference between revenue, R, and variable costs, VC, is the contribution toward offsetting fixed costs, and any positive contribution is better than none. Thus, if R ≥ VC then the firm should operate. If R < VC the firm should shut down.

=== Monopolist shutdown rule ===
A monopolist should shut down when price (average revenue) is less than average variable cost for every output level; in other words, it should shut down if the demand curve is entirely below the average variable cost curve. Under these circumstances, even at the profit-maximizing level of output (where MR = MC, marginal revenue equals marginal cost) average revenue would be lower than average variable costs and the monopolist would be better off shutting down in the short run.

=== Sunk costs ===
An implicit assumption of the above rules is that all fixed costs are sunk costs. However, there can be physical assets whose cost during production is fixed but which have a salvage value which can be obtained if there is a shutdown. When some costs are sunk and some are not sunk, total fixed costs (TFC) equal sunk fixed costs (SFC) plus non-sunk fixed costs (NSFC) or TFC = SFC + NSFC. When some fixed costs are non-sunk, the shutdown rule must be modified. To illustrate the new rule it is necessary to define a new cost curve, the average non-sunk cost curve, or ANSC. The ANSC equals the average variable costs plus the average non-sunk fixed cost or ANSC = AVC + ANFC. The new rule then becomes: if the price is greater than the minimum average cost, produce; if the price is between minimum average cost and minimum ANSC, produce; and if the price is less than minimum ANSC for all levels of production, shut down. If all fixed costs are non-sunk, then (a competitive) firm would shut down if the price were below average total costs.

== Short-run shutdown compared to long-run exit ==
A decision to shut down means that the firm is temporarily suspending production. It does not mean that the firm is going out of business (exiting the industry). If market conditions improve, due to prices increasing or production costs falling, the firm can resume production. Shutting down is a short-run decision. A firm that has shut down is not producing, but it still retains its capital assets; however, the firm cannot leave the industry or avoid its fixed costs in the short run.

However, a firm will not choose to incur losses indefinitely. In the long run, the firm will have to decide whether to continue in business or to leave the industry and pursue profits elsewhere. Exit is a long-term decision. A firm that has exited an industry has avoided all commitments and freed all capital for use in more profitable enterprises. A firm that exits an industry earns no revenue but it incurs no costs, fixed or variable.

The long-run decision is based on the relationship of the price P and long-run average costs LRAC. If P ≥ LRAC then the firm will not exit the industry. If P < LRAC, then the firm will exit the industry. These comparisons will be made after the firm has made the necessary and feasible long-term adjustments.

In the long run a firm operates where marginal revenue equals long-run marginal costs, but only if it decides to remain in the industry. Thus a perfectly competitive firm's long-run supply curve is the long-run marginal cost curve above the minimum point of the long-run average cost curve.

== Calculating the shutdown point ==
The short run shutdown point for a competitive firm is the output level at the minimum of the average variable cost curve. Assume that a firm's total cost function is TC = Q^{3} -5Q^{2} +60Q +125. Then its variable cost function is Q^{3} –5Q^{2} +60Q, and its average variable cost function is (Q^{3} –5Q^{2} +60Q)/Q= Q^{2} –5Q + 60. The slope of the average variable cost curve is the derivative of the latter, namely 2Q – 5. Equating this to zero to find the minimum gives Q = 2.5, at which level of output average variable cost is 53.75. Thus if the market price of the product drops below 53.75, the firm will choose to shut down production.

The long run shutdown point for a competitive firm is the output level at the minimum of the average total cost curve. Assume that a firm's total cost function is the same as in the above example. To find the shutdown point in the long run, first take the derivative of ATC and then set it to zero and solve for Q. After getting Q plug it into the MC to get the price.

== See also ==
- Contribution margin
- Profit maximization
- Sunk costs
