= Alan Walters =

British economist (1926–2009)

Sir Alan Walters
- Born: 17 June 1926; Leicester, England
- Died: 3 January 2009 (aged 82)
- Spouse: Margaret Patricia Wilson (m. 1975)

Academic background
- Education: University College, Leicester; Nuffield College, Oxford
- Influences: Ernest Cassel

Academic work
- Discipline: Economics
- School or tradition: Monetarism
- Institutions: University of Birmingham; London School of Economics; World Bank; Johns Hopkins University; American Enterprise Institute

Sir Alan Arthur Walters (17 June 1926 – 3 January 2009) was a British economist who was best known as the Chief Economic Adviser to Prime Minister Margaret Thatcher from 1981 to 1983 and (following his return from the United States) again for five months in 1989.

== Early life ==
Walters was born in Leicester. His father was a Communist and a grocer who sold goods from a van. He failed his eleven-plus and attended Alderman Newton's School in Leicester, leaving at fifteen to work as a machine operator in a shoe factory. During World War II, he was called up and joined the British Army as a private.

== Academic career ==
After the war, Walters studied statistics at University College, Leicester, and then went to Nuffield College, Oxford, where he took an MA in economics. On leaving Nuffield in 1951, he took up a post to teach statistics at Birmingham University, later becoming professor of econometrics and statistics there in the early 1960s. During the 1960s, he promoted Milton Friedman's monetarism.

In 1968–70 he was a member of the Commission on the Third London Airport (the "Roskill Commission").

After serving as a professor at the London School of Economics from 1968 to 1976, where he was Sir Ernest Cassel Professor of Economics, Walters became an economic adviser to the World Bank and a professor in the Economics Department at The Johns Hopkins University, during which time he co-authored with former LSE colleague Richard Layard, Baron Layard, a graduate-level textbook in microeconomic theory.

One of his most important contributions to economic theory was to demonstrate empirically that, for many industries, the costs at the high-scale end of the long-run cost curve is essentially constant or even declining. This was established in his article "Production and Cost Functions: An Econometric Survey", published by the journal Econometrica.

== Political career ==
In 1981, he was asked to become an economic adviser to Prime Minister Margaret Thatcher (who was elected in the 1979 general election), and advised on that year's budget, in which taxes were increased during a recession. This policy produced much criticism and was associated with rioting and high unemployment, but it has been argued that it enabled the sustained economic growth of the 1990s. In this role, Walters advised Thatcher that the Treasury should pay greater attention to narrower definitions of the money supply. He left this role in 1983 to join the American Enterprise Institute and at least some aspects of monetarist policies were publicly repudiated by Thatcher in 1985. He did, however, return to advise Thatcher in 1989, but his differences with the policies of the Chancellor of the Exchequer, Nigel Lawson, led to the resignation of both men on 26 October 1989.

Walters supported the controversial and ill-fated Community Charge (referred to as the "poll tax"). He opposed the similarly ill-fated policy of entry into the European Monetary System. In 1997, he stood as the Referendum Party candidate for the safe Conservative seat of the Cities of London and Westminster achieving 3% of the vote.

== Personal life ==
In 1975, Walters married Margaret Patricia Wilson, known as Paddie. He had a daughter by a previous marriage to Audrey Claxton. He was knighted in the Queen's 1983 Birthday Honours List.

He was an accomplished pianist, enjoying playing the works of Chopin and Beethoven. He also collected Thai porcelain and was a keen tennis player.

Walters was vice-chairman and director of AIG Trading Group, Inc.

Towards the end of his life, he suffered from Parkinson's disease. He died aged 82 at his home on 3 January 2009 following a short illness. Upon hearing of his death, Thatcher described him as "radical, fearless" and the "finest of friends".
