= Free entry =

Condition in which firms can freely enter a market

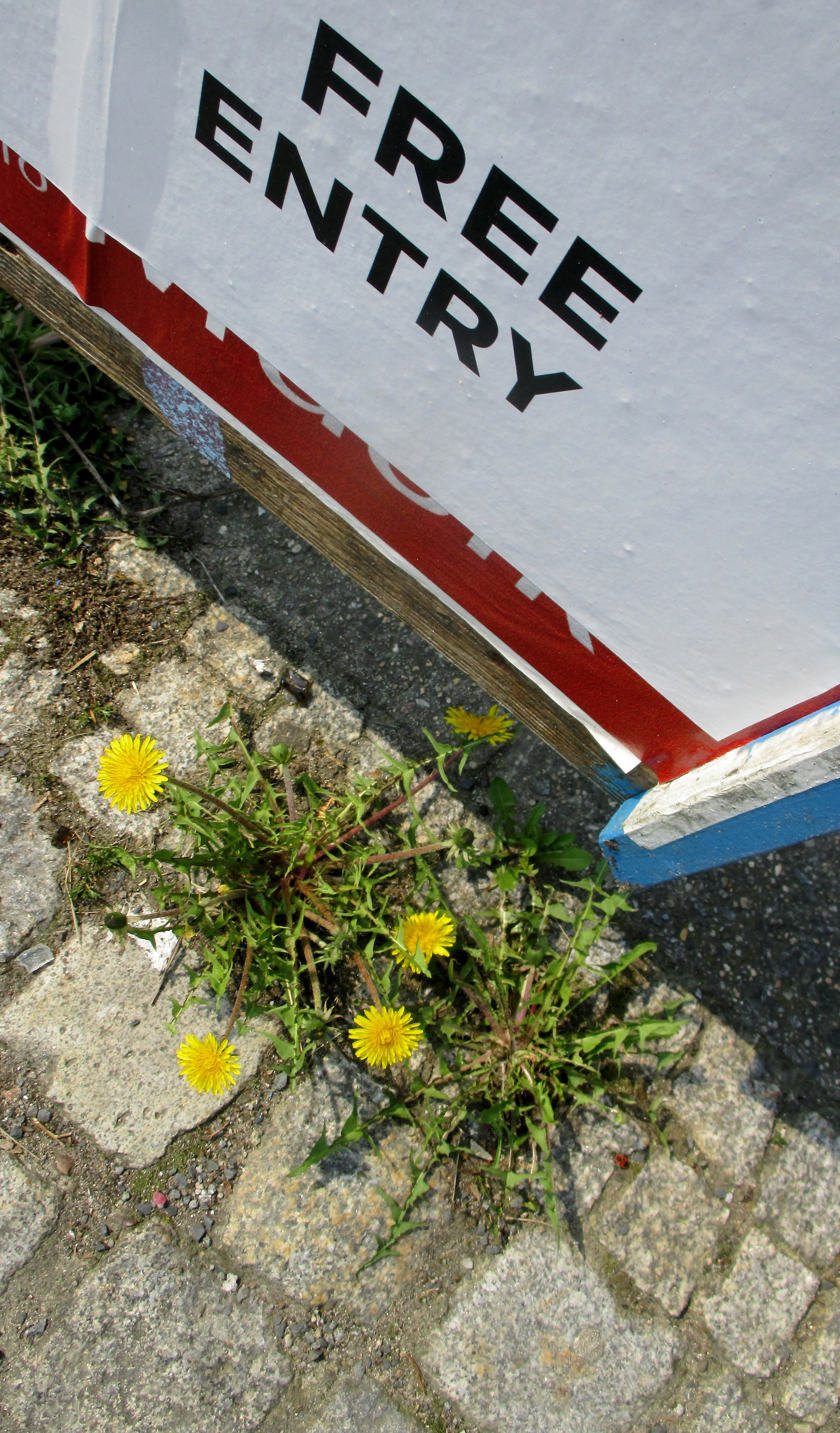
Free Entry - Poster

In economics, free entry is a condition in which firms can freely enter the market for an economic good by establishing production and beginning to sell the product. The assumption of free entry implies that if there are firms earning excessively high profits in a given industry, new firms that also seek a high profit are likely to start to produce or change into a production of the same good to join the market. In such a case there are no barriers preventing a start-up firm from competing. Where an opportunity of a profit arises we assume that there will also be firms entering the market for the certain good and compete for it. In most markets this condition is present only in the long run.

The assumption of free entry doesn't mean that a firm is simply able to set up a shop without any costs incurred. It is clear that the new entrant needs to gain the capital that they need for operating in the industry. Therefore, even with a free entry to a market the entrant still has to face the same cost structure as does an already existing firm.

Free entry is part of the perfect competition assumption that there are an unlimited number of buyers and sellers in a market. In conditions in which there is not a natural monopoly caused by unlimited economies of scale, free entry prevents any existing firm from maintaining a monopoly, which would restrict output and charge a higher price than a multi-firm market would.

Free entry is usually accompanied by free exit, under which condition firms that are incurring losses (such as would happen if there are too many firms producing the product so that each is producing too little to be at its minimum efficient scale) can readily leave the market. However, exiting a market may involve abandonment costs.

== Long run market supply with free entry and exit ==
Supposing that everyone in a market for a good has access to the same technology used for production of the good and can access the same market where inputs for the production can be bought to ensure a homogenous good and a perfect competition. In such a scenario all firms have in the market and all firms that can potentially enter the market have a uniform cost curve. In the short run the number of firms in the market is fixed. The entry of such a market depends on the incentives that influence existing businesses and potential new entrants. If firms that are already present in the market have high profits it is an incentives for other firms to join the market by setting up production or changing their product of focus. This free entry in times of good profits expands the number of firms, increases the supply of the good and pulls down prices and with it the profits. In the same manner, if firms in the market are experiencing losses and low profits many firms will exit the market which will bring up prices and increase profits. Remaining firms after the entries and exits must be making a zero economic profit. This process of entries and exits eventually drives average total cost and price to become equivalent at which point the process ends and firms are producing at their efficient scale.

== Barriers to entry ==
Firms that already possess market power try to preserve it in two ways: either by trying to prevent other firms a homogenous good as they are or by stopping new entrants from joining the industry. There are some potential barriers to entry that can arise from such a situation.

- A resource is owned by a single firm. For instance, one business might control the only well for clean water in a region.
- The government might grant a single firm a monopoly. For instance, the state might bar competition to a state owned utility company. Alternatively, one business might possess a legal patent or copyright on a certain good.
- The structure of the market or the production process might make a single producer most efficient – this is called a natural monopoly.

== See also ==
- Socially optimal firm size
