= Returns to scale =

Microeconomic concept

In economics, the concept of returns to scale arises in the context of a firm's production function. It explains the long-run linkage of increase in output (production) relative to associated increases in the inputs (factors of production).

In the long run, all factors of production are variable and subject to change in response to a given increase in production scale. In other words, returns to scale analysis is a long-term theory because a company can only change the scale of production in the long run by changing factors of production, such as building new facilities, investing in new machinery, or improving technology.

There are three possible types of returns to scale:

- If output increases by the same proportional change as all inputs change then there are constant returns to scale (CRS). For example, when inputs (labor and capital) increase by 100%, output increases by 100%.
- If output increases by less than the proportional change in all inputs, there are decreasing returns to scale (DRS). For example, when inputs (labor and capital) increase by 100%, the increase in output is less than 100%. The main reason for the decreasing returns to scale is the increased management difficulties associated with the increased scale of production, the lack of coordination in all stages of production, and the resulting decrease in production efficiency.
- If output increases by more than the proportional change in all inputs, there are increasing returns to scale (IRS). For example, when inputs (labor and capital) increase by 100%, the increase in output is greater than 100%. The main reason for the increasing returns to scale is the increase in production efficiency due to the expansion of the firm's production scale.

A firm's production function could exhibit different types of returns to scale in different ranges of output. Typically, there could be increasing returns at relatively low output levels, decreasing returns at relatively high output levels, and constant returns at some range of output levels between those extremes.

In mainstream microeconomics, the returns to scale faced by a firm are purely technologically imposed and are not influenced by economic decisions or by market conditions (i.e., conclusions about returns to scale are derived from the specific mathematical structure of the production function in isolation). As production scales up, companies can use more advanced and sophisticated technologies, resulting in more streamlined and specialised production within the company.

== Example ==
When the usages of all inputs increase by a factor of 2, new values for output will be:

- Twice the previous output if there are constant returns to scale (CRS)
- Less than twice the previous output if there are decreasing returns to scale (DRS)
- More than twice the previous output if there are increasing returns to scale (IRS)

Assuming that the factor costs are constant (that is, that the firm is a perfect competitor in all input markets) and the production function is homothetic, a firm experiencing constant returns will have constant long-run average costs, a firm experiencing decreasing returns will have increasing long-run average costs, and a firm experiencing increasing returns will have decreasing long-run average costs. However, this relationship breaks down if the firm does not face perfectly competitive factor markets (i.e., in this context, the price one pays for a good does depend on the amount purchased). For example, if there are increasing returns to scale in some range of output levels, but the firm is so big in one or more input markets that increasing its purchases of an input drives up the input's per-unit cost, then the firm could have diseconomies of scale in that range of output levels. Conversely, if the firm is able to get bulk discounts of an input, then it could have economies of scale in some range of output levels even if it has decreasing returns in production in that output range.

== Formal definitions ==
Formally, a production function $\ F(K,L)$ is defined to have:

- Constant returns to scale if (for any constant a greater than 0): $\ F(aK,aL)=aF(K,L)$. In this case, the function $F$ is homogeneous of degree 1.
- Decreasing returns to scale if (for any constant a greater than 1): $\ F(aK,aL)<aF(K,L)$
- Increasing returns to scale if (for any constant a greater than 1): $\ F(aK,aL)>aF(K,L)$

where K and L are factors of production—capital and labor, respectively.

In a more general set-up, for a multi-input-multi-output production processes, one may assume technology can be represented via some technology set, call it $\ T$, which must satisfy some regularity conditions of production theory. In this case, the property of constant returns to scale is equivalent to saying that technology set $\ T$ is a cone, i.e., satisfies the property $\ aT=T, \forall a>0$. In turn, if there is a production function that will describe the technology set $\ T$ it will have to be homogeneous of degree 1.

== Formal example ==
If the Cobb–Douglas production function has its general form

$$\ F(K,L)=AK^{b}L^{c}$$

with $0<b<1$ and $0<c<1,$ then

$$\ F(aK,aL)=A(aK)^{b}(aL)^{c}=Aa^{b}a^{c}K^{b}L^{c}=a^{b+c}AK^{b}L^{c}=a^{b+c}F(K,L),$$

and, for a > 1, there are increasing returns if b + c > 1, constant returns if b + c = 1, and decreasing returns if b + c < 1.

== See also ==
- Diseconomies of scale and Economies of scale
- Economies of agglomeration
- Economies of scope
- Experience curve effects
- Ideal firm size
- Homogeneous function
- Mohring effect
- Moore's law
