= Cost per procedure =

Medical pricing model

Cost per procedure, sometimes known as price per procedure, is a medical pricing model which describes the average cost of receiving a certain medical procedure.
