= Economic cost =

Combination of losses of goods

Economic cost is the combination of losses of any goods that have a value attached to them by any one individual. Economic cost is used mainly by economists as means to compare the prudence of one course of action with that of another. The comparison includes the gains and losses precluded by taking a course of action as well as those of the course taken itself. Economic cost differs from accounting cost because it includes opportunity cost. (Some sources refer to accounting cost as explicit cost and opportunity cost as implicit cost.)

== Aspects of economic costs ==
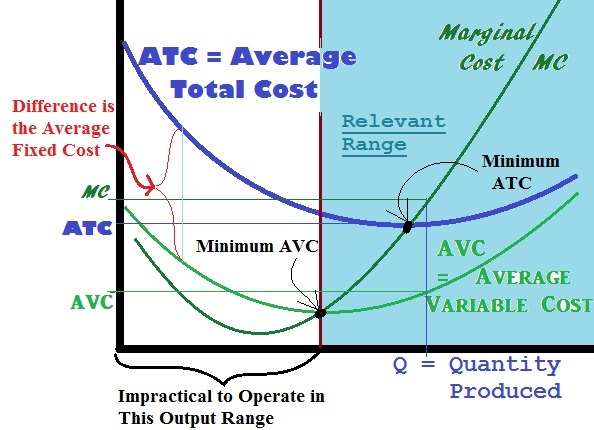
Shows a firm's Economic Costs in the "Short Run" - which, as defined, contains at least 1 "Fixed Cost" that cannot be changed or done away with even if the firm goes out of business (stops producing)

- Variable cost: Variable costs are the costs paid to the variable input. Inputs include labor, capital, materials, power and land and buildings. Variable inputs are inputs whose use vary with output. Conventionally the variable input is assumed to be labor.
  - Total variable cost (TVC) is the same as variable costs.
- Fixed cost (TFC) are the costs of the fixed assets those that do not vary with production.
  - Total fixed cost (TFC)
- Average cost (AC) are total costs divided by output. AC = TFC/q + TVC/q
  - Average fixed cost (AFC) is equal to total fixed cost divided by output i.e. AFC = TFC/q. The average fixed cost function continuously declines as production increases.
  - Average variable cost (A.V.C) = variable costs divided by output. AVC =TVC/q. The average variable cost curve is typically U-shaped. It lies below the average cost curve and generally has the same shape - the vertical distance between the average cost curve and average variable cost curve equals average fixed costs. The curve normally starts to the right of the y axis because with zero production
- Marginal cost (MC): Marginal cost is obtained from the additional cost that results from increasing output by one unit. It is the additional cost per additional unit of output.
- Cost curves: It is the graphical presentation of the costs of production as a function of total quantity produced
