= Economies of agglomeration =

Cost advantages from spatial concentration

Economies of agglomeration (also called agglomeration economies, agglomeration effects or economies of density) are productivity and cost advantages that arise when firms, workers, consumers, and other economic activity are located near one another. They are a central topic in urban economics, economic geography, and regional science, and help explain why economic activity is geographically concentrated in cities and industrial clusters.

Agglomeration refers to the spatial concentration of economic activity, whereas agglomeration economies refer specifically to benefits generated by that concentration. They are generally treated as external economies of scale, because a firm or worker may become more productive as surrounding economic activity increases even when the firm itself does not become larger.

Agglomeration economies can arise from the concentration of firms within the same industry, commonly called localization economies, or from the overall scale and diversity of a city, commonly called urbanization economies. The mechanisms producing these benefits include access to specialized suppliers and infrastructure, labor-market pooling and matching, and the creation and diffusion of knowledge.

The benefits of concentration are counterbalanced by diseconomies of agglomeration, including congestion, high land and housing costs, crowding, and exposure to pollution. The balance between these benefits and costs helps determine the size, density, and spatial organization of cities.

== Concept and terminology ==
Agglomeration economies are related to, but distinct from, internal economies of scale. Internal economies arise when a firm's average production cost falls as the scale of its own output increases. Agglomeration economies arise from the economic environment surrounding the firm and are external to the individual producer. A small firm can therefore benefit from locating in a large cluster without itself becoming large. It may gain access to specialized suppliers, a deeper labor market, infrastructure, customers, or knowledge that would be difficult or expensive to obtain in isolation.

Typically higher population densities allow synergies in service provision leading to lower unit costs. If large economies of density exist there is an incentive for firms to concentrate and agglomerate.

Geographic concentration does not by itself imply that agglomeration economies are its cause. Industries may also cluster because particular locations possess natural advantages, such as access to raw materials, climate, or transport routes. Studying the location of manufacturing industries in the United States, Ellison and Glaeser estimated that natural advantages accounted for roughly a fifth of observed geographic concentration, leaving the remainder to be explained by other mechanisms.

== Localization and urbanization economies ==
A common classification, associated with the location-theory tradition of Edgar M. Hoover, distinguishes localization economies from urbanization economies.

Localization economies arise when firms benefit from the concentration of economic activity within their own industry or closely related industries. A specialized cluster can support industry-specific suppliers, a workforce with specialized skills, and flows of technical information among firms. These economies are external to an individual firm but tied to the scale of the industry within the locality.

Urbanization economies arise from the scale or diversity of the urban economy as a whole rather than from concentration in one industry. Firms may benefit from a larger and more varied labor force, shared infrastructure, financial and professional services, a broad customer base, and ideas originating in other sectors.

The two forms often operate together, and empirical work has generally sought to measure their relative strength rather than to establish that a location exhibits one and not the other.

== Sources and mechanisms ==
The modern theory of agglomeration has important roots in Alfred Marshall's discussion of localized industries. Marshall described three advantages of geographic concentration: a local market for specialized skills, the emergence of subsidiary and specialized suppliers, and the rapid circulation of ideas and improvements among nearby producers.

Duranton and Puga group the micro-foundations proposed in the subsequent urban-economics literature into three broad categories: sharing, matching, and learning.

=== Sharing ===
Spatial concentration allows firms and workers to share facilities, suppliers, infrastructure, and risks that are costly to support individually.

One mechanism is the sharing of specialized intermediate suppliers. Where many firms use similar inputs, their combined demand can support a greater number and variety of specialized producers, and individual firms can buy in specialized goods and services rather than make them internally.

Large concentrations of activity can also support facilities with substantial fixed costs. Transport links, communications networks, professional services, and specialized machinery may become viable once their cost is spread across many users.

Labor-market pooling involves a further form of risk sharing. Where many employers require similar skills, a worker who loses one job has other potential employers nearby, and firms can draw on a larger pool of specialized workers when expanding or replacing staff.

=== Matching ===
Larger labor markets can improve the quality of matches between employers and employees. With a greater variety of workers and vacancies, firms are more likely to find employees with the skills they require, and workers more likely to find jobs suited to their abilities.

Matching mechanisms also operate between firms, suppliers, customers, and business partners. Larger local markets increase the number and variety of possible relationships and can make highly specialized activities economically viable.

=== Learning and knowledge spillovers ===
Proximity can assist the creation, transmission, and accumulation of knowledge. Firms and workers may learn through employee mobility, observation, formal collaboration, supplier and customer relationships, and informal interaction.

The literature on knowledge spillovers distinguishes several views of how such learning occurs. Marshall–Arrow–Romer (MAR) externalities concern knowledge transmitted among firms in the same or closely related industries, so that geographic specialization assists the accumulation of industry-specific knowledge. Theories associated with Jane Jacobs instead emphasize diversity, holding that interaction between different industries allows techniques developed in one activity to be transferred or recombined in another. A third view, associated with Michael Porter, shares Marshall's emphasis on specialization but treats local competition rather than local monopoly as the spur to innovation.

Empirical studies have found evidence consistent with both specialization-based and diversity-based externalities, and their relative importance varies across industries, locations, technologies, and time periods.

== Examples ==
Typical examples are found in logistic systems where the distribution or collection of goods is needed, such as solid waste management. Delivering, for instance, mail in an area with many postboxes results in overall cost savings and thus lower delivery costs. Different network infrastructures such as electricity or gas networks show as well economies of density.

== Empirical evidence ==
A large empirical literature has examined whether firms and workers are more productive in larger or denser urban areas. Estimated productivity effects are generally positive, but their magnitude varies substantially with the data, industry, country, geographic unit, and estimation method used.

Melo, Graham, and Noland analyzed 729 estimates drawn from 34 studies and reported a mean agglomeration elasticity of approximately 0.058, with wide variation around that figure. Differences in industrial coverage, the measure of agglomeration used, country characteristics, and econometric specification accounted for part of the spread.

As one illustration of magnitude, an OECD study using harmonized functional urban areas in Germany, Mexico, Spain, the United Kingdom, and the United States estimated that doubling city population was associated with an increase in productivity of roughly 2 to 5 percent.

=== Identification and sorting ===
An observed association between urban scale and productivity does not establish that agglomeration causes higher productivity. More productive workers and firms may disproportionately choose to locate in larger or more successful cities, creating a sorting or selection problem.

Reverse causality and omitted local characteristics present further difficulties. Productive firms may cause a city to grow rather than city size causing firms to become productive, and amenities, infrastructure, institutions, or natural advantages may influence both productivity and location.

Empirical studies address these problems using worker and firm fixed effects, instrumental variables, historical variables, and detailed microdata.

=== Spatial reach ===
Agglomeration effects vary with distance. Evidence has identified effects operating at regional, metropolitan, neighborhood, and even sub-neighborhood scales, with nearby activity generally exerting the strongest influence.

The relevant scale differs between mechanisms. Knowledge exchange and face-to-face interaction may be highly localized, while labor markets, supplier networks, and market-access effects operate over larger areas.

== Core–periphery models and new economic geography ==
Agglomeration is central to new economic geography, which studies how increasing returns, transport costs, market access, and factor mobility can generate uneven spatial distributions of economic activity.

In Paul Krugman's core-periphery model, manufacturing firms operating under increasing returns have an incentive to locate near large markets in order to realize scale economies while limiting transport costs. The location of market demand itself depends partly on where those firms and their workers are located. The result is a circular process of cumulative causation through which one region can become an industrialized core and another a less industrialized periphery.

Whether such a pattern emerges depends on the balance between agglomerating and dispersing forces. In Krugman's model it turns particularly on transport costs, economies of scale, and the share of manufacturing in the economy.

Agglomerating forces include market access, supplier linkages, labor pooling, and knowledge spillovers. Dispersing forces include high land and housing costs, congestion, competition for immobile resources, and the incentive to locate closer to geographically dispersed consumers or inputs.

== Diseconomies of agglomeration ==
The concentration that creates productivity advantages also generates costs. These diseconomies of agglomeration limit the net benefit of increasing city size or density and constitute the principal forces favoring dispersion.

=== Congestion and commuting ===
As population and employment concentrate, demand for road space and transport capacity can rise faster than infrastructure is provided. Congestion raises travel times and the cost of moving people and goods, offsetting some of the productivity advantage of proximity.

Concentration also makes high-capacity public transport and other shared infrastructure more viable. Whether density raises or lowers transport costs depends on urban form, the modes available, and how road space is priced.

=== Land and housing costs ===
Productive and accessible locations attract firms and residents, increasing demand for limited urban land. That demand is reflected in higher land and housing prices, particularly where the supply of developable land or floorspace is constrained.

Combes, Duranton, and Gobillon found that urban costs measured through house and land prices rise with city population in France, so that part of the benefit of a productive urban location is absorbed by the cost of occupying space there.

High land costs in turn encourage households and firms to use less space, build at higher densities, decentralize within a metropolitan area, or move elsewhere.

=== Crowding and infrastructure ===
Concentration places pressure on transport systems, public space, utilities, and other infrastructure, and crowding or overloaded services reduce welfare where capacity does not expand with demand.

Density can equally reduce the per-user cost of infrastructure by spreading fixed costs across more users, so that concentration produces both economies and diseconomies in the provision of urban services.

=== Environmental effects ===
Higher density concentrates exposure to local air pollution and other environmental hazards, but it also shortens travel distances, supports public transport, and encourages more energy-efficient forms of housing.

Research on household carbon emissions in the United States has found substantially lower emissions in many central cities than in their surrounding suburbs, reflecting differences in driving, public transport use, home heating, and electricity consumption.

Local air quality and total carbon emissions can therefore move in opposite directions as density rises, and the two are usually assessed separately.

== Policy implications ==
Agglomeration economies are external effects: an individual location decision affects the productivity and welfare of nearby firms and households. Congestion, pollution, and other urban costs are likewise external, so decentralized location decisions need not produce an efficient spatial outcome.

Policy can act on these effects through transport pricing and investment, housing and land-use regulation, infrastructure provision, environmental regulation, and metropolitan governance. Which instrument is appropriate depends on the benefits and costs present in a given case and on the geographic scale over which they operate.

The existence of agglomeration economies does not by itself justify policies promoting larger or denser cities. Encouraging concentration raises productivity where agglomeration benefits are strong, but can reduce welfare where it intensifies congestion, housing scarcity, or pollution.

Policies aimed at dispersing activity carry the opposite risk, sacrificing productivity where they separate firms and workers whose proximity generates external economies.

== See also ==
- Business cluster
- Cluster effect
- Core–periphery structure
- Economies of scale
- Economies of scope
- Economic geography
- Knowledge spillover
- Network effects
- New economic geography
- Returns to scale
- Urban economics
