= Extended cost =

In accounting, an extended cost is the unit cost multiplied by the number of those items that were purchased.

For example, four apples purchased at a unit cost of $1 have an extended cost of $4 (=$1 × 4 apples).

By accurately tracking extended cost, a business can make more informed decisions about pricing, purchasing, and inventory management.
