= Joel Dean =

Joel Dean may refer to:

- Joel Dean (economist) (1906–1979), American economist
- Joel Dean (fl. 1970s–2020s), one of the founders of Dean & DeLuca
- Joel Dean (fl. 2000s–2020s), co-writer for songs of Bill Grainer, songwriter and record producer

== See also ==
- Joel Deane (born 1969), Australian writer
