= Average cost pricing =

Method for regulating monopolies

Average cost pricing is one of the ways the government regulates a monopoly market. Monopolists tend to produce less than the optimal quantity pushing the prices up. The government may use average cost pricing as a tool to regulate prices monopolists may charge. Average cost pricing forces monopolists to reduce price to where the firm's average total cost (ATC) intersects the market demand curve.

The effect on the market would be:

- Increase production and decrease price.
- Increase social welfare (efficient resource allocation).
- Generate a normal profit for monopolist (Price = ATC) *
