= Prospective cost =

A prospective cost is a cost that may be incurred or changed if an action is taken: Whether or not the cost is paid depends on some action. Prospective costs can lead to unintended loss and positive or negative results for the stakeholders, and can be contrasted with sunk costs, which are costs that have already been incurred.

== Use in decision-making ==
Prospective costs are relevant to decision-making when they are expected to change as a result of a proposed action. In management accounting, relevant costs are future cash flows that arise because of a decision, while costs that will not change between alternatives are generally excluded from the analysis.

This distinguishes prospective costs from sunk costs, which have already been incurred and cannot be changed by a future decision. Relevant cash flows should arise in the future, while costs that occurred in the past are treated as sunk costs and excluded from relevant-cost analysis.
