= Joel Dean (economist) =

American economist

Joel Dean (1906–1979) was an American economist best known for his contributions to corporate finance theory in general, and particularly to the area of capital budgeting. He is regarded as one of the founders of business economics. His work on pricing remains influential in marketing.

== Biography ==
Dean was born in Vershire, Vermont and educated at Pomona College (A.B. 1927), Harvard Business School (MBA, 1928) and at the University of Chicago (Ph.D., 1936). His doctoral dissertation discussed "A Statistical Examination of the Behavior of Average and Marginal Cost". He was one of the founders of business economics with his Managerial Economics (1951) and Capital Budgeting (1951)

His research covered costs, pricing, demand analysis, profits and profit management, and also competition and government regulations. It was with the publication of his "Capital Budgeting" in 1951 that NPV became widely used in corporate finance. Discounted Cash Flow approach and Internal Rate of Return rule became popular by the ardent promotion of Joel Dean Associates.

He taught at Indiana University, the University of Chicago, and Columbia University. During World War II he was with the Office of Price Administration, and was also a research associate of the Cowles Commission. In 1940 he founded Joel Dean Associates, a management consulting firm. He was on the editorial boards of the Journal of Industrial Economics and the Journal of Marketing for many years.

== Cost functions ==
Dean discovered that cost functions of firms are often straight line as opposed to S-shaped functions a fact which disagreed with the classical assumption in microeconomics (which had not been based on observation).

It is thought that Dean's observation was ignored by the mainstream economists, for it required a revolutionary change of the theory of microeconomics: if the cost function of a firm is linear, then the total variable cost is proportional to the production volume and the marginal cost is constant, in which case the usual formula "price = marginal cost" fails, and the common explanation as to why the supply curve is an increasing function of the market price also fails.

== Selected works ==
Joel Dean's best known work is Capital Budgeting (New York: Columbia University Press, 1951. ISBN 0-231-01847-9). His Statistical Cost Estimation (Indiana University Press, 1976), by contrast, is a forgotten book, perhaps for the reasons outlined above.

Other publications include:

- "Does Advertising Belong in the Capital Budget?" Journal of Marketing, Vol. 30, No. 4., October 1966.
- "Pricing Policies for New Products". Harvard Business Review, Nov 1976.
- "An Approach to Internal Profit Measurement." National Accounting Association Bulletin, March 1958.
- "Better Management of Capital Expenditures through Research." Journal of Finance, May 1953.
- "Break-Even Analysis and the Measure of Capital Productivity." Advanced Management, April 1955.
- "Cost Structures of Enterprises and Break-Even Charts", The American Economic Review, 38(2) pp. 153–164, 1948.
