= Psychology of previous investment =

The phrase psychology of previous investment was coined by James Howard Kunstler to describe the sunk costs of the modern urban/suburban lifestyle. It is the reluctance to abandon technologies and standards of urban infrastructure into which humans have already made substantial investments, and is seen as a major contributor to modern energy crises. The term was applied to the reluctance to abandon territories facing sea level rise such as in Florida.

== See also ==
- Abandonment cost
- Normalcy bias
- Optimism bias
- Ostrich effect
- Pro-innovation bias
- Semmelweis reflex
- Sunk cost fallacy
