= Long-run cost curve =

Cost function in economics

In economics, a cost function represents the minimum cost of producing a quantity of some good. The long-run cost curve is a cost function that models this minimum cost over time, meaning inputs are not fixed. Using the long-run cost curve, firms can scale their means of production to reduce the costs of producing the good.

There are three principal cost functions (or 'curves') used in microeconomic analysis:

- Long-run total cost (LRTC) is the cost function that represents the total cost of production for all goods produced.
- Long-run average cost (LRAC) is the cost function that represents the average cost per unit of producing some good.
- Long-run marginal cost (LRMC) is the cost function that represents the cost of producing one more unit of some good.

The idealized "long run" for a firm refers to the absence of time-based restrictions on what inputs (such as factors of production) a firm can employ in its production technology. For example, a firm cannot build an additional factory in the short run, but this restriction does not apply in the long run. Because forecasting introduces complexity, firms typically assume that the long-run costs are based on the technology, information, and prices that the firm faces currently. The long-run cost curve does not try to anticipate changes in the firm, the technology, or the industry. It only reflects how costs would be different if there were no constraints on changing the inputs in the current period.

An ideal cost curve assumes technical efficiency because a firm always has an incentive to be as technically efficient as possible. Firms have a variety of methods of using various amounts of inputs, and they select the lowest total cost method for any given amount of output (quantity produced). For example, if a micro-enterprise wanted to make a few pins, the cheapest way to do so might be to hire a jack-of-all-trades, buy a little scrap metal, and have him work on it at home. However, if a firm wanted to produce thousands of pins, the lowest total cost might be achieved by renting a factory, buying specialized equipment, and hiring an assembly line of factory workers to perform specialized actions at each stage of producing the pins. In the short run, the firm might not have time to rent a factory, buy specialized tools, and hire factory workers. In that case, the firm would not be able to achieve short-run minimum costs, but the long-run costs would be much less. The increase in choices about how to produce in the long run means that long-run costs are equal to or less than short run costs, ceteris paribus.

The term curves does not necessarily mean the cost function has any curvature. However, many economic models assume that cost curves are differentiable so that the LRMC is well-defined. Traditionally, cost curves have quantity on the horizontal axis of the graph and cost on the vertical axis.

== See also ==
- Socially optimal firm size
