= Relevant cost =

A relevant cost (also called avoidable cost or differential cost) is a cost that differs between alternatives being considered. In order for a cost to be a relevant cost it must be:

- Future
- Cash Flow
- Incremental

It is often important for businesses to distinguish between relevant and irrelevant costs when analyzing alternatives because erroneously considering irrelevant costs can lead to unsound business decisions. Also, ignoring irrelevant data in analysis can save time and effort.

Types of irrelevant costs are:

- Sunk costs
- Committed costs
- Notional or Non cash costs (e.g depreciation and amortization)

== Example ==
A construction firm is in the middle of constructing an office building, having spent $1 million on it so far. It requires an additional $0.5 million to complete construction. Because of a downturn in the real estate market, the finished building will not fetch its original intended price, and is expected to sell for only $1.2 million. If, in deciding whether or not to continue construction, the $1 million sunk cost were incorrectly included in the analysis, the firm may conclude that it should abandon the project because it would be spending $1.5 million for a return of $1.2 million. However, the $1 million is an irrelevant cost, and should be excluded. Continuing the construction actually involves spending $0.5 million for a return of $1.2 million, which makes it the correct course of action.

A managerial accounting term for costs that are specific to management's decisions. The concept of relevant costs eliminates unnecessary data that could complicate the decision-making process.
