= Abandonment cost =

Economic consideration regarding asset write offs

Abandonment costs or Abandonment expenditure (ABEX) are costs associated with the abandonment of a business venture.

Abandonment costs traditionally applied to the process of abandoning an under-producing or non-producing oil or gas well. In that context, it means the removal of equipment, plugging of the well with cement, any environmental clean-up, etc. necessary to shut the well down. It is occasionally referred to as "Removal and Abandonment" or R & A. The objective of well abandonment is to ensure that no hydrocarbons leak into surface water or into the atmosphere. The cost of a routine abandonment of a typical well in the United States is about $5,000 (~Texas average cost in year 2000). Recent figures are far higher: across the 27 states that reported cost data, the average cost of plugging an orphaned or abandoned well in 2023 was $41,139, and state averages ranged from $3,664 to $343,750 per well. Cost depends on factors such as well depth, condition, location and accessibility. If a well has developed a leak that allows gas to flow up the outside of the well casing, finding and correcting the leak can push the cost of abandonment beyond $100,000. Wells that have been used as injectors or have been subject to fracking operation are more likely to develop leaks because the injected substances can create channels that permit uncontrolled flow outside the casing.

The term's application has been broadened from its original context to apply to the abandonment of other business ventures, primarily in manufacturing. It is often used in a cost-benefit analysis to determine if a marginal venture should be continued or if it is more financially beneficial to abandon the venture and plow the remaining money into something else in an attempt to recoup the losses. For example, General Motors had some abandonment costs from shutting down the Pontiac and Saturn brands. The existence of abandonment costs in an industry implies that there is no free exit from that industry.

== See also ==
- Psychology of previous investment
- Capital expenditure
