= Average cost =

Total cost divided by number of goods produced

In economics, average cost (AC) or unit cost is equal to total cost (TC) divided by the number of units of a good produced (the output Q):

$$AC=\frac{TC}{Q}.$$

Average cost is an important factor in determining how businesses will choose to price their products.

== Short-run average cost ==
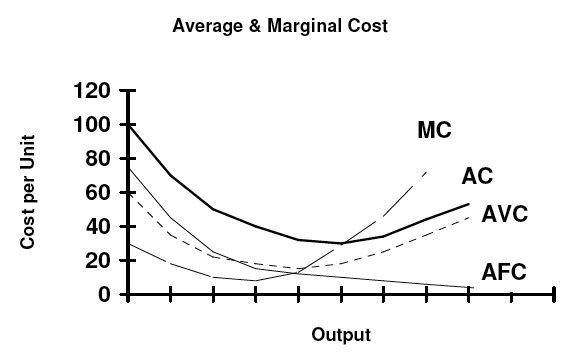
Average cost (AC) curve Average variable cost (AVC) Average fixed cost (AFC) Marginal cost (MC; crosses the minimum points of both the AC and AVC curves)

Short-run costs are those that vary with almost no time lagging. Labor cost and the cost of raw materials are short-run costs, but physical capital is not.

An average cost curve can be plotted with cost on the vertical axis and quantity on the horizontal axis. Marginal costs are often also shown on these graphs, with marginal cost representing the cost of the last unit produced at each point; marginal costs in the short run are the slope of the variable cost curve (and hence the first derivative of variable cost).

A typical average cost curve has a U-shape, because fixed costs are all incurred before any production takes place and marginal costs are typically increasing, because of diminishing marginal productivity. In this "typical" case, for low levels of production marginal costs are below average costs, so average costs are decreasing as quantity increases. An increasing marginal cost curve intersects a U-shaped average cost curve at the latter's minimum, after which the average cost curve begins to slope upward. For further increases in production beyond this minimum, marginal cost is above average costs, so average costs are increasing as quantity increases. For example: for a factory designed to produce a specific quantity of widgets per period—below a certain production level, average cost is higher due to under-used equipment, and above that level, production bottlenecks increase average cost.

== Long-run average cost ==
Long-run average cost is the unit cost of producing a certain output when all inputs, even physical capital, are variable. The behavioral assumption is that the firm will choose that combination of inputs that produce the desired quantity at the lowest possible cost.

A long-run average cost curve is typically downward sloping at relatively low levels of output, and upward or downward sloping at relatively high levels of output. Most commonly, the long-run average cost curve is U-shaped, by definition reflecting economies of scale where negatively sloped and diseconomies of scale where positively sloped.

If the firm is a perfect competitor in all input markets, and thus the per-unit prices of all its inputs are unaffected by how much of the inputs the firm purchases, then it can be shown that at a particular level of output, the firm has economies of scale (i.e., is operating in a downward sloping region of the long-run average cost curve) if and only if it has increasing returns to scale, the latter being exclusively a feature of the production function. Likewise, it has diseconomies of scale (is operating in an upward sloping region of the long-run average cost curve) if and only if it has decreasing returns to scale, and has neither economies nor diseconomies of scale if it has constant returns to scale. With perfect competition in the output market the long-run market equilibrium will involve all firms operating at the minimum point of their long-run average cost curves (i.e., at the borderline between economies and diseconomies of scale).

If, however, the firm is not a perfect competitor in the input markets, then the above conclusions are modified. For example, if there are increasing returns to scale in some range of output levels, but the firm is so big in one or more input markets that increasing its purchases of an input drives up the input's per-unit cost, then the firm could have diseconomies of scale in that range of output levels. Conversely, if the firm is able to get bulk discounts of an input, then it could have economies of scale in some range of output levels even if it has decreasing returns in production in that output range.

In some industries, long-run average cost is always declining (economies of scale exist indefinitely). This means that the largest firm tends to have a cost advantage, and the industry tends naturally to become a monopoly, and hence is called a natural monopoly. Natural monopolies tend to exist in industries with high capital costs in relation to variable costs, such as water supply and electricity supply.

== Relationship to marginal cost ==
When average cost is declining as output increases, marginal cost is less than average cost. When average cost is rising, marginal cost is greater than average cost. When average cost is neither rising nor falling (at a minimum or maximum), marginal cost equals average cost.

Other special cases for average cost and marginal cost appear frequently:

- Constant marginal cost/high fixed costs: each additional unit of production is produced at constant additional expense per unit. The average cost curve slopes down continuously, approaching marginal cost. An example is hydroelectric generation, which has no fuel expense, limited maintenance expenses and a high up-front fixed cost (ignoring irregular maintenance costs or useful lifespan). Industries with fixed marginal costs, such as electrical transmission networks, may meet the conditions for a natural monopoly, because once capacity is built, the marginal cost to the incumbent of serving an additional customer is always lower than the average cost for a potential competitor. The high fixed capital costs are a barrier to entry.
- Two popular pricing mechanisms are average cost pricing (or rate of return regulation) and marginal cost pricing. A monopoly produces where its average cost curve meets the market demand curve under average cost pricing, referred to as the average cost pricing equilibrium.
- Minimum efficient scale: Marginal or average costs may be nonlinear, or have discontinuities. Average cost curves may therefore only be shown over a limited scale of production for a given technology. For example, a nuclear plant would be extremely inefficient (high average cost) for production in small quantities. Similarly, its maximum output for any given time period may essentially be fixed, and production above that level may be technically impossible, dangerous or extremely costly. The long run elasticity of supply are higher, as new plants could be built and brought on-line.
- Zero fixed costs (long-run analysis) and constant marginal cost: since there are no economies of scale, average cost is equal to the constant marginal cost.

== Relationship between AC, AFC, AVC and MC ==
1. The Average Fixed Cost curve (AFC) starts from a height and goes on declining continuously as production increases.

2. The Average Variable Cost curve, Average Cost curve and the Marginal Cost curve start from a height, reach the minimum points, then rise sharply and continuously.

3. The Average Fixed Cost curve approaches zero asymptotically. The Average Variable Cost curve is never parallel to or as high as the Average Cost curve due to the existence of positive Average Fixed Costs at all levels of production; but the Average Variable Cost curve asymptotically approaches the Average Cost curve from below.

4. The Marginal Cost curve always passes through the minimum points of the Average Variable Cost and Average Cost curves, though the Average Variable Cost curve attains the minimum point prior to that of the Average Cost curve.

== See also ==
- Cost curve
- Optimal firm size
- Average variable cost
- Average fixed cost
