= Sunk cost =

Unrecoverable cost that has been incurred

In economics and business decision-making, a sunk cost (also known as retrospective cost) is a cost that has already been incurred and cannot be recovered. Sunk costs are contrasted with prospective costs, which are future costs that may be avoided if action is taken. In other words, a sunk cost is a sum paid in the past that should no longer be relevant to decisions about the future. Even though economists argue that sunk costs are no longer relevant to future rational decision-making, people in everyday life often take previous expenditures in situations, such as repairing a car or house, into their future decisions regarding those properties.

== Bygones principle ==
According to classical economics and standard microeconomic theory, only prospective (future) costs are relevant to a rational decision. At any moment in time, the best thing to do depends only on current alternatives. The only things that matter are the future consequences. Past mistakes are irrelevant. Any costs incurred prior to making the decision have already been incurred no matter what decision is made. They may be described as "water under the bridge", and making decisions on their basis may be described as "crying over spilt milk". In other words, people should not let sunk costs influence their decisions; sunk costs are irrelevant to rational decisions. Thus, if a new factory was originally projected to cost $100 million, and yield $120 million in value, and after $30 million is spent on it the value projection falls to $65 million, the company should abandon the project rather than spending an additional $70 million to complete it. Conversely, if the value projection falls to $75 million, the company, as a rational actor, should continue the project. This is known as the bygones principle or the marginal principle.

The bygones principle is grounded in the branch of normative decision theory known as rational choice theory, particularly in expected utility hypothesis. Expected utility theory relies on a property known as cancellation, which says that it is rational in decision-making to disregard (cancel) any state of the world that yields the same outcome regardless of one's choice. Past decisions—including sunk costs—meet that criterion.

The bygones principle can also be formalised as the notion of "separability". Separability requires agents to take decisions by comparing the available options in eventualities that can still occur, uninfluenced by how the current situation was reached or by eventualities that are precluded by that history. In the language of decision trees, it requires the agent's choice at a particular choice node to be independent of unreachable parts of the tree. This formulation makes clear how central the principle is to standard economic theory by, for example, founding the folding-back algorithm for individual sequential decisions and game-theoretical concepts such as sub-game perfection.

Until a decision-maker irreversibly commits resources, the prospective cost is an avoidable future cost and is properly included in any decision-making process. For instance, if someone is considering pre-ordering movie tickets, but has not actually purchased them yet, the cost remains avoidable.

Both retrospective and prospective costs could be either fixed costs (continuous for as long as the business is operating and unaffected by output volume) or variable costs (dependent on volume). However, many economists consider it a mistake to classify sunk costs as "fixed" or "variable". For example, if a firm sinks $400 million on an enterprise software installation, that cost is "sunk" because it was a one-time expense and cannot be recovered once spent. A "fixed" cost would be monthly payments made as part of a service contract or licensing deal with the company that set up the software. The upfront irretrievable payment for the installation should not be deemed a "fixed" cost, with its cost spread out over time. Sunk costs should be kept separate. The "variable costs" for this project might include data centre power usage, for example.

There are cases in which taking sunk costs into account in decision-making, violating the bygones principle, is rational. For example, for a manager who wishes to be perceived as persevering in the face of adversity, or to avoid blame for earlier mistakes, it may be rational to persist with a project for personal reasons even if it is not the benefit of their company. Or, if they hold private information about the undesirability of abandoning a project, it is fully rational to persist with a project that outsiders think displays the fallacy of sunk cost.

== Fallacy effect ==
The bygones principle does not always accord with real-world behavior. Sunk costs often influence people's decisions, with people believing that investments (i.e., sunk costs) justify further expenditures. People demonstrate "a greater tendency to continue an endeavor once an investment in money, effort, or time has been made". This is the sunk cost fallacy, and such behavior may be described as "throwing good money after bad", while refusing to succumb to what may be described as "cutting one's losses". People can remain in failing relationships because they "have already invested too much to leave". Other people are swayed by arguments that a war must continue because lives will have been sacrificed in vain unless victory is achieved. Individuals caught up in psychologically manipulative scams will continue investing time, money and emotional energy into the project, despite doubts or suspicions that something is not right. These types of behaviour do not seem to accord with rational choice theory and are often classified as behavioural errors.

Rego, Arantes, and Magalhães point out that the sunk cost effect exists in committed relationships. They devised two experiments, one of which showed that people in a relationship which they had invested money and effort in were more likely to keep that relationship going than end it. In the second experiment, people in a relationship they invested time in tended to devote more time to the relationship.

According to evidence reported by De Bondt and Makhija (1988), managers of many utility companies in the United States have been overly reluctant to terminate economically unviable nuclear plant projects. In the 1960s, the nuclear power industry promised "energy too cheap to meter". Nuclear power lost public support in the 1970s and 1980s, when public service commissions nationwide ordered prudency reviews. From these reviews, De Bondt and Makhija find evidence that the commissions denied many utility companies even partial recovery of nuclear construction costs on the grounds that they had been mismanaging the nuclear construction projects in ways consistent with throwing good money after bad.

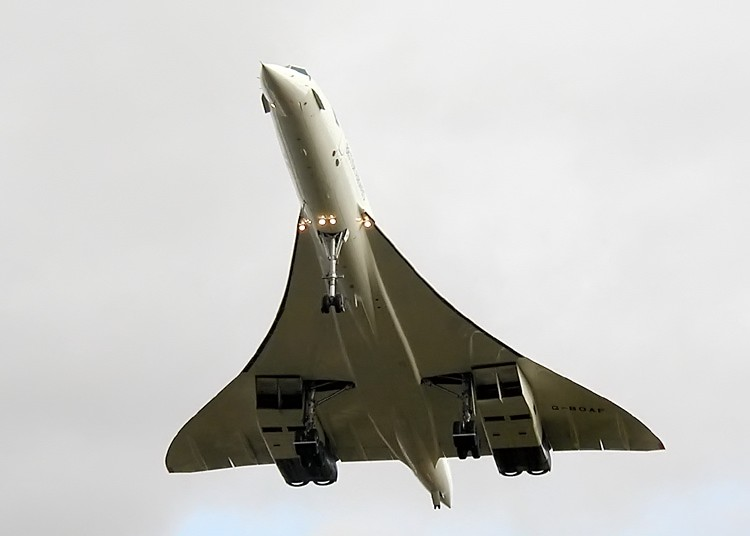
The sunk cost fallacy has also been called the "Concorde fallacy": the British and French governments took their past expenses on the costly supersonic jet as a rationale for continuing the project, as opposed to "cutting their losses".

There is also evidence of government representatives failing to ignore sunk costs. The term "Concorde fallacy" derives from the fact that the British and French governments continued to fund the joint development of the costly Concorde supersonic airplane even after it became apparent that there was no longer an economic case for the aircraft. The British government privately regarded the project as a commercial disaster that should never have been started. Political and legal issues made it impossible for either government to pull out.

The idea of sunk costs is often employed when analyzing business decisions. A common example of a sunk cost for a business is the promotion of a brand name. This type of marketing incurs costs that cannot normally be recovered. It is not typically possible to later "demote" one's brand names in exchange for cash. A second example is research and development (R&D) costs. Once spent, such costs are sunk and should not affect future pricing decisions. A pharmaceutical company's attempt to justify high prices because of the need to recoup R&D expenses would be fallacious. The company would charge a high price whether R&D cost one dollar or one million. R&D costs and the ability to recoup those costs are a factor in deciding whether to spend the money on R&D in the first place.

Dijkstra and Hong proposed that part of a person's behavior is influenced by a person's current emotions. Their experiments showed that emotional responses benefit from the sunk cost fallacy. Negative influences lead to the sunk cost fallacy. For example, anxious people face the stress brought about by the sunk cost fallacy. When stressed, they are more motivated to invest in failed projects rather than take additional approaches. Their report shows that the sunk cost fallacy will have a greater impact on people under high load conditions, and people's psychological state and external environment will be the key influencing factors.

The sunk cost effect may cause cost overrun. In business, an example of sunk costs may be an investment into a factory or research that now has a lower value or none. For example, $20 million has been spent on building a power plant; the value now is zero because it is incomplete (and no sale or recovery is feasible). The plant can be completed for an additional $10 million or abandoned, and a different but equally valuable facility built for $5 million. Abandonment and construction of the alternative facility is the more rational decision, even though it represents a total loss of the original expenditure—the original sum invested is a sunk cost. If decision-makers are irrational or have the "wrong" (different) incentives, the completion of the project may be chosen. For example, politicians or managers may have more incentive to avoid the appearance of a total loss. In practice, there is considerable ambiguity and uncertainty in such cases, and decisions may, in retrospect, appear irrational that were, at the time, reasonable to the economic actors involved and in the context of their incentives. A decision-maker might make rational decisions according to their incentives, outside of efficiency or profitability. This is considered an incentive problem and is distinct from a sunk cost problem. Some research has also noted circumstances where the sunk cost effect is reversed, where individuals appear irrationally eager to write off earlier investments to take up a new endeavor.

=== Plan continuation bias ===
A related phenomenon is plan continuation bias, which is recognised as a subtle cognitive bias that tends to force the continuation of a plan or course of action even in the face of changing conditions. In the field of aerospace, it has been recognised as a significant causal factor in accidents, with a 2004 NASA study finding that in 9 out of the 19 accidents studied, aircrew exhibited this behavioural bias.

This is a hazard for ships' captains or aircraft pilots who may stick to a planned course even when it is leading to a fatal disaster, and they should abort instead. A famous example is the Torrey Canyon oil spill in which a tanker ran aground when its captain persisted with a risky course rather than accepting a delay. It has been a factor in numerous air crashes and an analysis of 279 approach and landing accidents (ALAs) found that it was the fourth most common cause, occurring in 11% of cases. Another analysis of 76 accidents found that it was a contributory factor in 42% of cases.

There are also two predominant factors that characterise the bias. The first is an overly optimistic estimate of the probability of success, possibly to reduce cognitive dissonance making a decision. The second is that of personal responsibility: when you are personally accountable, it is difficult for you to admit that you were wrong.

Projects often suffer cost overruns and delays due to the planning fallacy and related factors, including excessive optimism, an unwillingness to admit failure, groupthink, and aversion to loss of sunk costs.

== Psychological factors ==
The psychology of the cognitive bias offers a set of "need to act fast" biases (light green) that affect rationality in economics. [click twice to browse].

Evidence from behavioral economics suggests that there are at least four specific psychological factors underlying the sunk cost effect:

- Framing effects, a cognitive bias where people decide on options based on whether the options are presented with positive or negative connotations; e.g. as a loss or as a gain. People tend to avoid risk when a positive frame is presented but seek risks when a negative frame is presented.
- An overoptimistic probability bias, whereby after an investment the evaluation of one's investment-reaping dividends is increased.
- The requisite of personal responsibility. Sunk cost appears to operate chiefly in those who feel a personal responsibility for the investments that are to be viewed as a sunk cost.
- The desire not to appear wasteful—"One reason why people may wish to throw good money after bad is that to stop investing would constitute an admission that the prior money was wasted."

Taken together, these results suggest that the sunk cost effect may reflect non-standard measures of utility, which is ultimately subjective and unique to the individual.

=== Framing effect ===
The framing effect which underlies the sunk cost effect builds upon the concept of extensionality where the outcome is the same regardless of how the information is framed. This is in contradiction to the concept of intentionality, which is concerned with whether the presentation of information changes the situation in question.

Take two mathematical functions:

1. f(x) = 2x + 10
2. f(x) = 2 · (x + 5)

While these functions are framed differently, regardless of the input "x", the outcome is analytically equivalent. Therefore, if a rational decision maker were to choose between these two functions, the likelihood of each function being chosen should be the same. However, a framing effect places unequal biases towards preferences that are otherwise equal.

The most common type of framing effect was theorised in Kahneman & Tversky, 1979 in the form of valence framing effects. This form of framing signifies types of framing. The first type can be considered positive where the "sure thing" option highlights the positivity whereas if it is negative, the "sure thing" option highlights the negativity, while both being analytically identical. For example, saving 200 people from a sinking ship of 600 is equivalent to letting 400 people drown. The former framing type is positive and the latter is negative.

Ellingsen, Johannesson, Möllerström and Munkammar have categorised framing effects in a social and economic orientation into three broad classes of theories. Firstly, the framing of options presented can affect internalised social norms or social preferences – this is called variable sociality hypothesis. Secondly, the social image hypothesis suggests that the frame in which the options are presented will affect the way the decision maker is viewed and will in turn affect their behaviour. Lastly, the frame may affect the expectations that people have about each other's behaviour and will in turn affect their own behaviour.

=== Overoptimistic probability bias ===
In 1968, Knox and Inkster approached 141 horse bettors: 72 of the people had just finished placing a $2.00 bet within the past 30 seconds, and 69 people were about to place a $2.00 bet in the next 30 seconds. Their hypothesis was that people who had just committed themselves to a course of action (betting $2.00) would reduce post-decision dissonance by believing more strongly than ever that they had picked a winner. Knox and Inkster asked the bettors to rate their horse's chances of winning on a 7-point scale. What they found was that people who were about to place a bet rated the chance that their horse would win at an average of 3.48 which corresponded to a "fair chance of winning" whereas people who had just finished betting gave an average rating of 4.81 which corresponded to a "good chance of winning". Their hypothesis was confirmed: after making a $2.00 commitment, people became more confident their bet would pay off. Knox and Inkster performed an ancillary test on the patrons of the horses themselves and managed (after normalization) to repeat their finding almost identically. Other researchers have also found evidence of inflated probability estimations.

=== Sense of personal responsibility ===
In a study of 96 business students, Staw and Fox gave the subjects a choice between making an R&D investment either in an underperforming company department, or in other sections of the hypothetical company. Staw and Fox divided the participants into two groups: a low responsibility condition and a high responsibility condition. In the high responsibility condition, the participants were told that they, as manager, had made an earlier, disappointing R&D investment. In the low responsibility condition, subjects were told that a former manager had made a previous R&D investment in the underperforming division and were given the same profit data as the other group. In both cases, subjects were then asked to make a new $20 million investment. There was a significant interaction between assumed responsibility and average investment, with the high responsibility condition averaging $12.97 million and the low condition averaging $9.43 million. Similar results have been obtained in other studies.

=== Desire not to appear wasteful ===
A ticket buyer who purchases a ticket in advance to an event they eventually turn out not to enjoy makes a semi-public commitment to watching it. To leave early is to make this lapse of judgment manifest to strangers, an appearance they might otherwise choose to avoid. As well, the person may not want to leave the event because they have already paid, so they may feel that leaving would waste their expenditure. Alternatively, they may take a sense of pride in having recognised the opportunity cost of the alternative use of time.

== Neuroeconomics and neuroscience approaches ==
In recent years, there has been a resurgence in studies of how the brain processes information with respect to sunk costs. Measuring sensitivity to sunk costs in laboratory studies can be challenging, as it is often difficult to disentangle the influence of sunk costs from future returns on investment. In a cross-species study in humans, rats, and mice, Sweis et al discovered a conserved evolutionary history to sensitivity to sunk costs across species.

This has opened up more questions as to what might the evolutionary drivers be behind why the brain is capable of processing information in this way, what utility, if any, sensitivity to sunk costs may confer, and how might distinct circuits in the brain give rise to this sort of valuation depending on the framing of the question, circumstances of the environment, or state of the individual. Ongoing work is characterizing how neurons encode sensitivity to sunk costs, how sunk costs appear only after certain types of choices, and how sunk costs could contribute to mood burden.

== See also ==
- Disposition effect
- Endowment effect
- Escalation of commitment
- Region-beta paradox
- Foot-in-the-door technique
- Prospect theory
- Psychology of previous investment
- Stop-loss order
- Thinking, Fast and Slow
