= Behavioral assumption =

Assumption in economics that humans will attempt to maximize their utilities

In behavioral economics, the behavioral assumption is that, under their resource constraints, humans are rational actors – they will attempt to maximize their utilities, thereby generating the greatest profit and outcomes.

The two most important characteristics of the human under the behavioral assumption are rationality and self-interest.
