= Diseconomies of scale =

Microeconomics effect

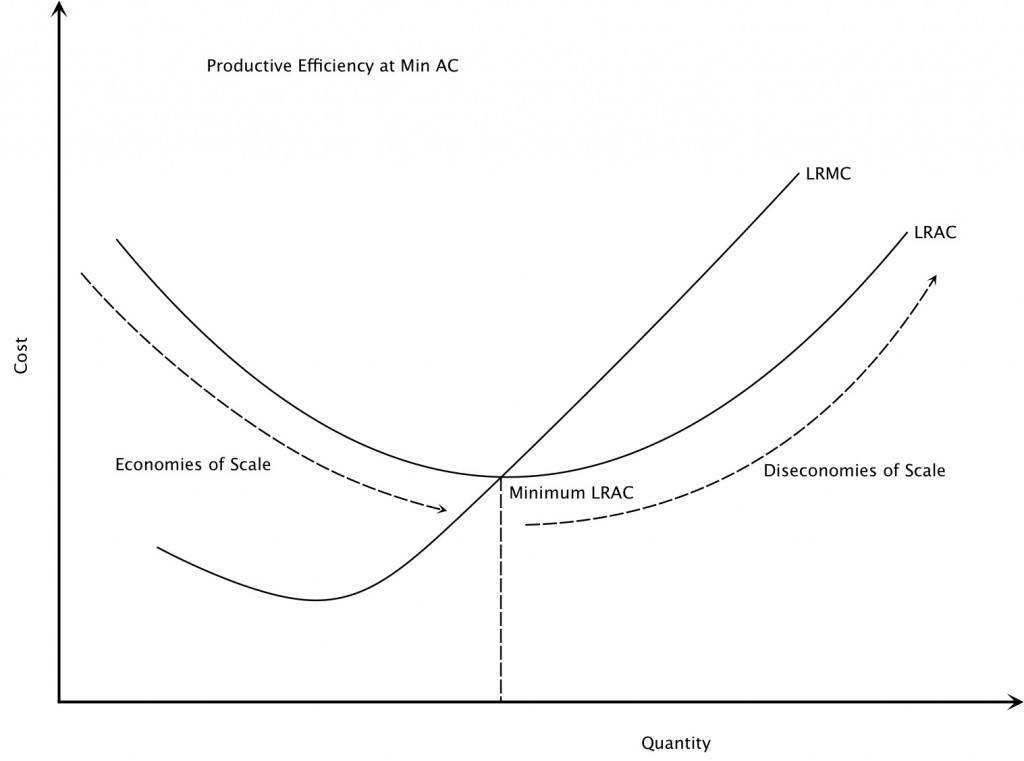
The rising part of the long-run average cost curve illustrates the effect of diseconomies of scale. The Long Run Average Cost (LRAC) curve plots the average cost of producing the lowest cost method. The Long Run Marginal Cost (LRMC) is the change in total cost attributable to a change in the output of one unit after the plant size has been adjusted to produce that rate of output at minimum LRAC.

In microeconomics, diseconomies of scale are the cost disadvantages that economic actors accrue due to an increase in organizational size or in output, resulting in production of goods and services at increased per-unit costs. The concept of diseconomies of scale is the opposite of economies of scale. It occurs when economies of scale become dysfunctional for a firm. In business, diseconomies of scale are the features that lead to an increase in average costs as a business grows beyond a certain size.

== Causes ==
=== Communication costs ===
Ideally, all employees of a firm would have one-on-one communication with each other so they know exactly what the other workers are doing. A firm with a single worker does not require any communication between employees. A firm with two workers requires one communication channel, directly between those two workers. A firm with three workers requires three communication channels between employees (between employees A & B, B & C, and A & C). Here is a chart of one-on-one communication channels required:

Workers	Communication Channels
1	0
2	1
3	3
4	6
5	10
n	$\frac{n(n-1)}{2}$

The graph of all one-on-one channels is a complete graph.

The number of one-on-one channels of communication grows more rapidly than the number of workers, thus increasing the time and costs of communication. At some point one-on-one communications between all workers becomes impractical; therefore only certain groups of employees will communicate with one another (e.g. within departments or within geographical locations). This reduces, but does not stop, the increase in unit costs; and also the organisation will incur some inefficiencies due to the reduced level of communication.

=== Duplication of effort ===
An organisation with just one person cannot have any duplication of effort between employees. If there are two employees, there could be some duplication of efforts, but this is likely to be minor, as each of the two will generally know what the other is working on. When organisations grow to thousands of workers, it is inevitable that someone, or even a team, will take on a function that is already being handled by another person or team. In colloquial terms, this is described as "one hand not knowing what the other hand is doing". General Motors, for example, developed two in-house CAD/CAM systems: CADANCE was designed by the GM Design Staff, while Fisher Graphics was created by the former Fisher Body division. These similar systems later needed to be combined into a single Corporate Graphics System, CGS, at great expense. A smaller firm would have had neither the money to allow such expensive parallel developments, nor the lack of communication and cooperation which precipitated this event. In addition to CGS, GM also used CADAM, UNIGRAPHICS, CATIA and other off-the-shelf CAD/CAM systems, thus increasing the cost of translating designs from one system to another. This endeavor eventually became so unmanageable that they acquired (and then eventually sold off) Electronic Data Systems (EDS) in an effort to control the situation. Smaller firms typically choose a single off-the-shelf CAD/CAM system, with no need to combine or translate between systems.

=== Office politics ===
"Office politics" is management behavior which a manager knows is counter to the best interest of the company, but is in their personal best interest. For example, a manager might intentionally promote an incompetent worker, knowing that the worker will never be able to compete for the manager's job. This type of behavior only makes sense in a company with multiple levels of management. The more levels there are, the more opportunity for this behavior. In a small company, such behavior could cause the company to go bankrupt, and thus cost the manager their job, so they would not make such a decision. In a large company, one manager would not have much effect on the overall health of the company, so such "office politics" are in the interest of individual managers.

=== Top-heavy companies ===
As an organisation increases in size, it becomes costly to keep control of a sprawling corporate empire, and this often results in bureaucracy as executives implement more and more levels of management. As firms increase in size, managers will initially provide a net benefit to the firm and increase productivity; however, as a firm grows and covers a larger geographical area and/or employs more people, a principal–agent problem arises, leading to lower productivity. To counter this, executives introduce standards and controls in order to maintain productivity, and this necessitates the hiring of more managers to apply these standards and controls, hence the proportion of managerial to working class begins to lean towards managerial and the company becomes "top-heavy". However, these additional managers are not providing additional output: they are spending their time implementing standards and carrying out supervision that is unnecessary in smaller firms, hence the cost-per-unit has increased.

=== Supply-chain disruption ===
Global emergencies, such as COVID-19 in 2020, can easily disrupt supply chains. This disruption has a higher chance of affecting large organizations - especially when there are only a few large suppliers. Smaller organizations with robust, local supply networks can manage supply chain shocks because any localized shock has a smaller effect on the overall ecosystem.

== Other effects which reduce competitiveness of large firms ==
These do not always increase the cost-per-unit, but do reduce the ability of a large firm to compete.

=== Cannibalization ===
A small firm only competes with other firms, but larger firms frequently find their own products are competing with each other. A Buick was just as likely to steal customers from another GM make, such as an Oldsmobile, as it was to steal customers from other companies. This may help to explain why Oldsmobiles were discontinued after 2004. This self-competition wastes resources that should be used to compete with other firms.

=== Isolation of decision-makers from the results of their decisions ===
If a single person makes and sells donuts and decides to try jalapeño flavoring, they would likely know on the same day whether their decision was good or not, based on the reaction of customers. A decision-maker at a huge company that makes donuts may not know for many months if such a decision is embraced by consumers or if it is rejected, especially if their research or marketing team fails to respond in a timely manner. By that time, the decision-makers may very well have moved on to another division or company and thus see no consequence from their decision. This lack of consequences can lead to poor decisions and cause an upward-sloping average cost curve.

=== Slow response time ===
In a reverse example, the smaller firm will know immediately if people begin to request other products, and be able to respond the next day. A large company would need to do research, create an assembly line, determine which distribution chains to use, plan an advertising campaign, etc., before any changes could be made. By this time, the smaller competitors may well have grabbed that market niche.

=== Inertia (Unwillingness to change) ===
This will be defined as the "we've always done it that way, so there's no need to ever change" attitude (see appeal to tradition). An old, successful company is far more likely to have this attitude than a new, struggling one. While "change for change's sake" is counter-productive, refusal to consider change, even when indicated, is likewise toxic to a company, as changes in the industry and market conditions will inevitably demand changes in the firm in order to remain successful. An example is Polaroid Corporation's delay in moving into digital imaging, which adversely affected the company, ultimately leading to bankruptcy.

=== Public and government opposition ===
Such opposition is largely a function of the size of the firm. Behavior from Microsoft, which would have been ignored from a smaller firm, was seen as an anti-competitive and monopolistic threat, due to Microsoft's size, thus bringing about government lawsuits.

=== Large market share ===
A small company with only a 1% market share could relatively easily double market share, and hence revenues, in a year. A large company with 50% market share will find it difficult to do so.

=== Large market portfolio ===
A small investment fund can potentially yield a higher return because it can concentrate its investments in a small number of good opportunities without driving up the purchase price as they buy in, and later sell them without driving down the sale price as they sell off. Conversely, a large investment fund must spread its investments among so many securities that its results tend to track those of the market as a whole. As the size of the market controlled grows, the results will be closer to market average.

=== Inelasticity of supply ===
A company which is heavily dependent on a resource supply of a fixed or relatively fixed size will have trouble increasing production. For instance, a timber company cannot increase production above the sustainable harvest rate of its land (although it can still increase production by acquiring more land). Similarly, service companies are limited by available labor (and thus tend to concentrate in large, densely populated metropolitan areas); STEM (science, technology, engineering, and mathematics) professions are often-cited examples.

=== Reputation ===
Larger firms have a reputation to uphold and as a result may place more restrictions on employees, limiting their efficiency. This will be seen amplified in a regulated industry, where a company losing its license would be an extremely serious event.

=== Other effects related to size ===
Large firms also tend to be old and in mature markets. Both of these have negative implications for future growth. Old firms tend to have a large retiree base, with high associated pension and health costs, and may be unionized, with associated higher salaries and labor rights. Mature markets tend to only offer the potential for small, incremental growth. (Everybody might go out and buy a new invention next year, but it is unlikely they will all buy cars next year, since most people already have them.)

=== Impact on smaller firms ===
While diseconomies of scale are typically associated with large mature firms, similar problems have been observed in the growth phase of small and medium-sized manufacturing companies. Mclean has observed that this can occur once the workforce exceeds around 20 employees. At this point business complexity grows more rapidly than revenue. The business experiences falling productivity, leading to rising variable costs along with rapidly rising overheads.

== Solutions ==
Solutions to the diseconomies of scale for large firms may involve splitting the company into smaller organisations. This can either happen by default when the company is in financial difficulties, sells off its profitable divisions and shuts down the rest; or can happen proactively, if the management is willing.

To avoid the negative effects of diseconomies of scale, a firm must stick to the lowest average output cost and try to recognise any external diseconomies of scale. Moreover, on reaching the lowest average cost, a firm must either expand to other countries to increase demand for its products, or seek new markets or produce new products that do not compete with its original products. However, neither of these actions will necessarily eliminate communications and management problems often associated with large organisations.

A systematic analysis and redesign of business processes, in order to reduce complexity, can counter diseconomies of scale. (Of course, this phase of analysis and revamping in itself can be, and usually is, a diseconomy leading to hiring of new personnel and investment in new, competing systems.) This leads to increased productivity. Improved management systems and more effective control of labor and operations can lower overhead.

=== Example ===
Returning to the example of the large donut firm, each retail location could be allowed to operate relatively autonomously from the company headquarters.

For instance, the local management may decide on the following factors instead of relying on the central management:

1. Employee decisions such as hiring, firing, promotions and wage scales, where the local management is directly involved and likely to have better understanding of each employee. For instance, employers may choose to offer higher wages and charge higher prices if they are in an affluent area.
2. Purchasing decisions, with each location allowed to choose its own suppliers, which may or may not be owned by the corporation (wherever they find the best quality and prices).
3. Research and marketing decisions. Each firm may decide to develop their own recipes or utilise different signature flavour unique to their locale. For instance, when fresh apple cider is available at bargain prices from local farmers in October, they may choose to market a cinnamon donut and hot apple cider combo.

While a single, large, centrally controlled firm may have higher ability to innovate and develop or market new products more effectively than when its resources are divided, it may lack the flexibility to offer individual customizations. Allowing the different retail locations to make decisions independent of the central management may allow them to meet local consumers' demands more efficiently.

In addition, if the employees own a portion of the local business, employees will also have a more vested interest in its success.

Note that all these changes will likely result in a substantial reduction in corporate headquarters staff and other support staff. For this reason, many businesses delay such a reorganization until it is too late to be effective. However, the whole company incurs reputation and legal risks arising from each unit.

== Criticism ==
The empirical validity of diseconomies of scale as a rule of thumb has been criticised in recent years, following the increasing concentration of transnational corporations on the global level. The Cambridge economist Peter Nolan calculated that in almost all global production sectors, transnational corporations had merged and concentrated since the 1980s instead of succumbing to diseconomies of scale, leading to significant market power concentration and oligopolistic competition on the global level. This criticism suggests that earlier concerns on diseconomies of scale, e.g. voiced by Alfred Marshall, are increasingly invalid, as improvements to global supply chains, communication technology and reduction of transport costs allow benefits of scale (e.g. concentration of spending on R&D and market power) to trump diseconomies of scale.

== See also ==
- Brooks's law
- Ringelmann effect
- Minimum efficient scale
- Too big to fail
