= Cost curve =

Graph used in economics

In economics, a cost curve is a graph of the costs of production as a function of total quantity produced. In a free market economy, productively efficient firms optimize their production process by minimizing cost consistent with each possible level of production, and the result is a cost curve. Profit-maximizing firms use cost curves to decide output quantities. There are various types of cost curves, all related to each other, including total and average cost curves; marginal ("for each additional unit") cost curves, which are equal to the differential of the total cost curves; and variable cost curves. Some are applicable to the short run, others to the long run.

== Notation ==
There are standard acronyms for each cost concept, expressed in terms of the following descriptors:

- SR = short run (costs spent on non-reusable materials e.g raw materials)
- LR = long-run (cost spent on renewable materials e.g equipment)
- A = average (per unit of output)
- M = marginal (for an additional unit of output)
- F = fixed (unadjustable)
- V = variable (adjustable)
- T = total (fixed plus variable)
- C = cost

These can be combined in various ways to express different cost concepts (with SR and LR often omitted when the context is clear): one from the first group (SR or LR); none or one from the second group (A, M, or none (meaning “level”)); none or one from the third group (F, V, or T); and the fourth item (C).

From the various combinations we have the following short-run cost curves:

- Short-run average fixed cost (SRAFC)
- Short-run average total cost (SRAC or SRATC)
- Short-run average variable cost (AVC or SRAVC)

- Short-run marginal cost (SRMC)
- Short-run fixed cost (FC or SRFC)
- Short-run total cost (SRTC)
- Short-run variable cost (VC or SRVC)

and the following long-run cost curves:

- Long-run average total cost (LRAC or LRATC)
- Long-run marginal cost (LRMC)
- Long-run total cost (LRTC)

== Short-run total cost (SRTC) and long-run total cost (LRTC) curves ==
The total cost curve, if non-linear, can represent increasing and diminishing marginal returns.

The short-run total cost (SRTC) and long-run total cost (LRTC) curves are increasing in the quantity of output produced because producing more output requires more labor usage in both the short and long runs, and because in the long run producing more output involves using more of the physical capital input; and using more of either input involves incurring more input costs.

With only one variable input (labor usage) in the short run, each possible quantity of output requires a specific quantity of usage of labor, and the short–run total cost as a function of the output level is this unique quantity of labor times the unit cost of labor. But in the long run, with the quantities of both labor and physical capital able to be chosen, the total cost of producing a particular output level is the result of an optimization problem: The sum of expenditures on labor (the wage rate times the chosen level of labor usage) and expenditures on capital (the unit cost of capital times the chosen level of physical capital usage) is minimized with respect to labor usage and capital usage, subject to the production function equality relating output to both input usages; then the (minimal) level of total cost is the total cost of producing the given quantity of output.

== Short-run variable and fixed cost curves (SRVC and SRFC or VC and FC) ==
One can decompose total costs as the sum of fixed costs and variable costs. Here output is measured along the horizontal axis. In the Cost-Volume-Profit Analysis model, total costs are linear in volume.

Since short-run fixed cost (FC/SRFC) does not vary with the level of output, its curve is horizontal as shown here. Short-run variable costs (VC/SRVC) increase with the level of output, since the more output is produced, the more of the variable input(s) needs to be used and paid for.

== Short-run average variable cost curve (AVC or SRAVC) ==
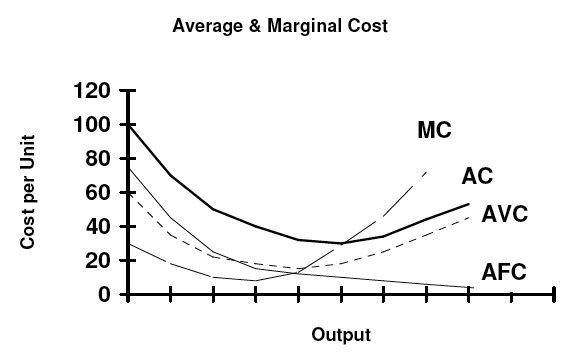
A U-shaped short-run Average Cost (AC) curve. AVC is the Average Variable Cost, AFC the Average Fixed Cost, and MC the marginal cost curve crossing the minimum of both the Average Variable Cost curve and the Average Cost curve.

Average variable cost (AVC/SRAVC) (which is a short-run concept) is the variable cost (typically labor cost) per unit of output: SRAVC = wL / Q where w is the wage rate, L is the quantity of labor used, and Q is the quantity of output produced. The SRAVC curve plots the short-run average variable cost against the level of output and is typically drawn as U-shaped. However, whilst this is convenient for economic theory, it has been argued that it bears little relationship to the real world. Some estimates show that, at least for manufacturing, the proportion of firms reporting a U-shaped cost curve is in the range of 5 to 11 percent.

== Short-run average fixed cost curve (SRAFC) ==
Since fixed cost by definition does not vary with output, short-run average fixed cost (SRAFC) (that is, short-run fixed cost per unit of output) is lower when output is higher, giving rise to the downward-sloped curve shown.

== Short-run and long-run average total cost curves (SRATC or SRAC and LRATC or LRAC) ==
The average total cost curve is constructed to capture the relation between cost per unit of output and the level of output, ceteris paribus. A perfectly competitive and productively efficient firm organizes its factors of production in such a way that the usage of the factors of production is as low as possible consistent with the given level of output to be produced. In the short run, when at least one factor of production is fixed, this occurs at the output level where it has enjoyed all possible average cost gains from increasing production. This is at the minimum point in the above diagram.

Short-run total cost is given by

$$STC = P_{K} \cdot K + P_{L} \cdot L$$,

where P_{K} is the unit price of using physical capital per unit time, P_{L} is the unit price of labor per unit time (the wage rate), K is the quantity of physical capital used, and L is the quantity of labor used. From this we obtain short-run average cost, denoted either SATC or SRAC, as STC / Q:

$$SRATC\ or\ SRAC = \frac{P_{K} \cdot K}{Q} + \frac{P_{L} \cdot L}{Q} = \frac{P_{K} \cdot P_{K}}{A} + \frac{P_{L} \cdot P_{L}}{A}$$,

where $AP_{K} = \frac{Q}{K}$ is the average product of capital and $AP_{L} = \frac{Q}{L}$ is the average product of labor.

Within the graph above, the Average Fixed Cost curve and Average Variable Cost curve cannot start with zero, as at quantity zero these values are not defined since they would involve dividing by zero.

Short-run average cost (SRATC/SRAC) equals average fixed costs plus average variable costs. Average fixed cost continuously falls as production increases in the short run, because K is fixed in the short run. The shape of the average variable cost curve is directly determined by increasing and then diminishing marginal returns to the variable input (conventionally labor).

The long-run average cost (LRATC/LRAC) curve looks similar to the short-run curve, but it allows the usage of physical capital to vary.

== Short-run marginal cost curve (SRMC) ==
Typical marginal cost curve

A short-run marginal cost (SRMC) curve graphically represents the relation between marginal (i.e., incremental) cost incurred by a firm in the short-run production of a good or service and the quantity of output produced. This curve is constructed to capture the relation between marginal cost and the level of output, holding other variables, like technology and resource prices, constant. The marginal cost curve is usually U-shaped. Marginal cost is relatively high at small quantities of output; then as production increases, marginal cost declines, reaches a minimum value, then rises. The marginal cost is shown in relation to marginal revenue (MR), the incremental amount of sales revenue that an additional unit of the product or service will bring to the firm. This shape of the marginal cost curve is directly attributable to increasing, then decreasing marginal returns (and the law of diminishing marginal returns). Marginal cost equals w/MP_{L}. For most production processes the marginal product of labor initially rises, reaches a maximum value and then continuously falls as production increases. Thus marginal cost initially falls, reaches a minimum value and then increases. The marginal cost curve intersects both the average variable cost curve and (short-run) average total cost curve at their minimum points. When the marginal cost curve is above an average cost curve the average curve is rising. When the marginal costs curve is below an average curve the average curve is falling. This relation holds regardless of whether the marginal curve is rising or falling.

== Long-run marginal cost curve (LRMC) ==
The long-run marginal cost (LRMC) curve shows for each unit of output the added total cost incurred in the long run, that is, the conceptual period when all factors of production are variable. Stated otherwise, LRMC is the minimum increase in total cost associated with an increase of one unit of output when all inputs are variable.

The long-run marginal cost curve is shaped by returns to scale, a long-run concept, rather than the law of diminishing marginal returns, which is a short-run concept. The long-run marginal cost curve tends to be flatter than its short-run counterpart due to increased input flexibility. The long-run marginal cost curve intersects the long-run average cost curve at the minimum point of the latter. When long-run marginal cost is below long-run average cost, long-run average cost is falling (as additional units of output are considered). When long-run marginal cost is above long run average cost, average cost is rising. Long-run marginal cost equals short run marginal-cost at the least-long-run-average-cost level of production. LRMC is the slope of the LR total-cost function.

== Graphing cost curves together with revenue curves ==
Cost curves in perfect competition compared to marginal revenue

Cost curves can be combined to provide information about firms. In this diagram for example, firms are assumed to be in a perfectly competitive market. In a perfectly competitive market the price that firms are faced with in the long run would be the price at which the marginal cost curve cuts the average cost curve, since any price above or below that would result in entry to or exit from the industry, driving the market-determined price to the level that gives zero economic profit.

== Cost curves and production functions ==
Assuming that factor prices are constant, the production function determines all cost functions. The variable cost curve is the constant price of the variable input times the inverted short-run production function or total product curve, and its behavior and properties are determined by the production function. (Note: The slope of the short-run production function equals the marginal product of the variable input, conventionally labor. The slope of the variable cost function is marginal cost. The relationship between MC and the marginal product of labor MP_{L} is MC = w/MP_{L}. Because the wage rate w is assumed to be constant the shape of the variable cost curve is completely dependent on the marginal product of labor. The short-run total cost curve is simply the variable cost curve plus fixed costs.) Because the production function determines the variable cost function it necessarily determines the shape and properties of marginal cost curve and the average cost curves.

If the firm is a perfect competitor in all input markets, and thus the per-unit prices of all its inputs are unaffected by how much of the inputs the firm purchases, then it can be shown that at a particular level of output, the firm has economies of scale (i.e., is operating in a downward sloping region of the long-run average cost curve) if and only if it has increasing returns to scale. Likewise, it has diseconomies of scale (is operating in an upward sloping region of the long-run average cost curve) if and only if it has decreasing returns to scale, and has neither economies nor diseconomies of scale if it has constant returns to scale. In this case, with perfect competition in the output market the long-run market equilibrium will involve all firms operating at the minimum point of their long-run average cost curves (i.e., at the borderline between economies and diseconomies of scale).

If, however, the firm is not a perfect competitor in the input markets, then the above conclusions are modified. For example, if there are increasing returns to scale in some range of output levels, but the firm is so big in one or more input markets that increasing its purchases of an input drives up the input's per-unit cost, then the firm could have diseconomies of scale in that range of output levels. On the other hand, if the firm is able to get bulk discounts of an input, then it could have economies of scale in some range of output levels even if it has decreasing returns in production in that output range.

== Relationship between different curves ==
- Total Cost = Fixed Costs (FC) + Variable Costs (VC) = Average Total Cost (ATC) x Quantity (Q)
- Marginal Cost (MC) = dC/dQ; MC equals the slope of the total cost function and of the variable cost function
- Average Total Cost (ATC) = Total Cost/Q
- Average Fixed Cost (AFC) = FC/Q
- Average Variable Cost (AVC) = VC/Q.
- ATC = AFC + AVC
  - At a level of Q at which the MC curve is above the average total cost or average variable cost curve, the latter curve is rising.
  - If MC is below average total cost or average variable cost, then the latter curve is falling.
  - If MC equals average total cost, then average total cost is at its minimum value.
  - If MC equals average variable cost, then average variable cost is at its minimum value.

== Relationship between short-run and long-run cost curves ==
For each quantity of output there is one cost–minimizing level of capital and a unique short–run average cost curve associated with producing the given quantity. The following statements assume that the firm is using the optimal level of capital for the quantity produced. If not, then the SRAC curve would lie "wholly above" the LRAC and would not be tangent at any point.

- Each STC curve can be tangent to the LRTC curve at only one point. The STC curve cannot cross (intersect) the LRTC curve. The STC curve can lie wholly “above” the LRTC curve with no tangency point.
- One STC curve is tangent to LRTC at the long–run cost–minimizing level of production. At the point of tangency LRTC = STC. At all other levels of production STC will exceed LRTC.
- Average cost functions are the total cost function divided by the level of output. Therefore, the SATC curve is also tangent to the LRATC curve at the cost-minimizing level of output. At the point of tangency LRATC = SATC. At all other levels of production SATC > LRATC To the left of the point of tangency the firm is using too much capital and fixed costs are too high. To the right of the point of tangency the firm is using too little capital and diminishing returns to labor are causing costs to increase.
- The slope of the total cost curves equals marginal cost. Therefore, when STC is tangent to LTC, SMC = LRMC.
- At the long–run cost–minimizing level of output LRTC = STC; LRATC = SATC and LRMC = SMC,.
- The long–run cost–minimizing level of output may be different from the minimum SATC.
- With fixed unit costs of inputs, if the production function has constant returns to scale, then at the minimal level of the SATC curve we have SATC = LRATC = SMC = LRMC.
- With fixed unit costs of inputs, if the production function has increasing returns to scale, the minimum of the SATC curve is to the right of the point of tangency between the LRAC and the SATC curves. Where LRTC = STC, LRATC = SATC and LRMC = SMC.
- With fixed unit costs of inputs and decreasing returns the minimum of the SATC curve is to the left of the point of tangency between LRAC and SATC, where LRTC = STC, LRATC = SATC and LRMC = SMC.
- With fixed unit input costs, a firm that is experiencing increasing (decreasing) returns to scale and is producing at its minimum SAC can always reduce average cost in the long run by expanding (reducing) the use of the fixed input.
- LRATC will always equal to or be less than SATC.
- If production process is exhibiting constant returns to scale then minimum SRAC equals minimum long run average cost. The LRAC and SRAC intersect at their common minimum values. Thus under constant returns to scale SRMC = LRMC = LRAC = SRAC .
- If the production process is experiencing decreasing or increasing, minimum short run average cost does not equal minimum long run average cost. If increasing returns to scale exist long run minimum will occur at a lower level of output than SRAC. This is because there are economies of scale that have not been exploited so in the long run a firm could always produce a quantity at a price lower than minimum short run average cost simply by using a larger plant.
- With decreasing returns, minimum SRAC occurs at a lower production level than minimum LRAC because a firm could reduce average costs by simply decreasing the size or its operations.
- The minimum of a SRAC occurs when the slope is zero. Thus the points of tangency between the U-shaped LRAC curve and the minimum of the SRAC curve would coincide only with that portion of the LRAC curve exhibiting constant economies of scale. For increasing returns to scale the point of tangency between the LRAC and the SRAC would have to occur at a level of output below level associated with the minimum of the SRAC curve.

== U-shaped curves ==
Both the SRAC and LRAC curves are typically expressed as U-shaped. However, the shapes of the curves are not due to the same factors. For the short run curve the initial downward slope is largely due to declining average fixed costs. Increasing returns to the variable input at low levels of production also play a role, while the upward slope is due to diminishing marginal returns to the variable input. With the long run curve the shape by definition reflects economies and diseconomies of scale. At low levels of production long run production functions generally exhibit increasing returns to scale, which, for firms that are perfect competitors in input markets, means that the long run average cost is falling; the upward slope of the long run average cost function at higher levels of output is due to decreasing returns to scale at those output levels.

== Empirical shape of average cost curves ==
There is some evidence that shows that average cost curves are not typically U-shaped. In a survey by Wilford J. Eiteman and Glenn E. Guthrie in 1952 managers of 334 companies were shown a number of different cost curves, and asked to specify which one best represented the company’s cost curve. 95% of managers responding to the survey reported cost curves with constant or falling costs.

Alan Blinder, former vice president of the American Economics Association, conducted the same type of survey in 1998, which involved 200 US firms in a sample that should be representative of the US economy at large. He found that about 40% of firms reported falling variable or marginal cost, and 48.4% reported constant marginal/variable cost.

== See also ==
- Cost
- Economic cost
- General equilibrium
- Joel Dean (economist)
- Long-run cost curve
- Partial equilibrium
- Point of total assumption
- Socially optimal firm size
