= Average variable cost =

Variable costs of production divided by total output

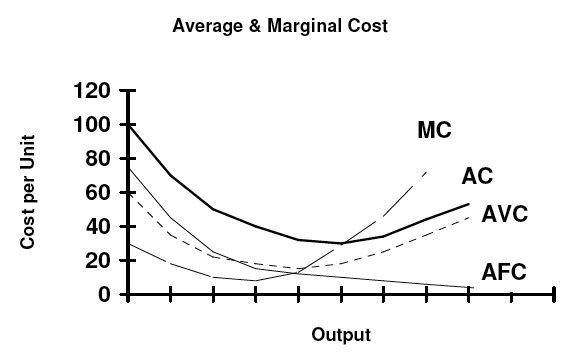
Short-run cost curves. Average cost (AC) Average variable cost (AVC) Average fixed cost (AFC) Marginal cost (MC; crosses the minimum points of both the AC and AVC curves)

In economics, average variable cost (AVC) is a firm's variable costs (VC; labour, electricity, etc.) divided by the quantity of output produced (Q):
$$AVC = \frac{VC}{Q}$$

Average variable cost plus average fixed cost equals average total cost (ATC):
$$AVC + AFC = ATC.$$

A firm would choose to shut down if the price of its output is below average variable cost at the profit-maximizing level of output (or, more generally if it sells at multiple prices, its average revenue is less than AVC). Producing anything would not generate revenue significant enough to offset the associated variable costs; producing some output would add losses (additional costs in excess of revenues) to the costs inevitably being incurred (the fixed costs). By not producing, the firm loses only the fixed costs.

As a result, the firm's short-run supply curve has output of 0 when the price is below the minimum AVC and jumps to output such that $\text{P = MC(Q)}$ for higher prices, where $\text{MC}$ denotes marginal cost.

== See also ==
- Variable cost
- Fixed cost
- Cost curve
