= Average fixed cost =

Fixed costs of production divided by the quantity of output

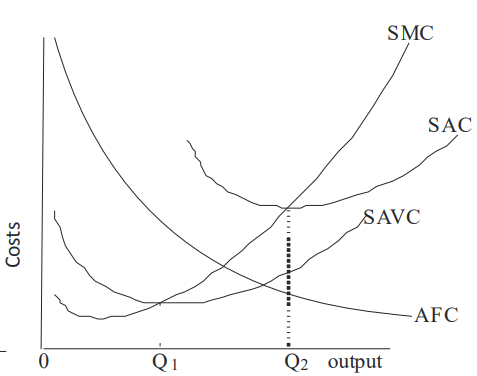
Short-run cost curves including the average fixed cost (AFC)

In economics, average fixed cost (AFC) is the fixed costs of production (FC) divided by the quantity (Q) of output produced. Fixed costs are those costs that must be incurred in fixed quantity regardless of the level of output produced.

$$AFC = \frac{FC}{Q}.$$

Average fixed cost is the fixed cost per unit of output. As the total number of units of the good produced increases, the average fixed cost decreases because the same amount of fixed costs is being spread over a larger number of units of output. The average fixed cost is a reciprocal function that plots a rectangular hyperbola.

Average variable cost plus average fixed cost equals average total cost:

$$ATC=AVC+AFC$$

== Explanation ==
=== Example 1 ===
Assume a firm produces clothing. When the quantity of the output varies from 5 shirts to 10 shirts, fixed cost would be 30 dollars. In this case, the average fixed cost of producing 5 shirts would be 30 dollars divided by 5 shirts, which is 6 dollars. In other words, when 5 shirts are produced, 30 dollars of fixed cost would spread and result in 6 dollars per shirt. Similarly, the average fixed cost of producing 10 shirts would be 3 dollars derived from 30 dollars divided by 10 shirts.

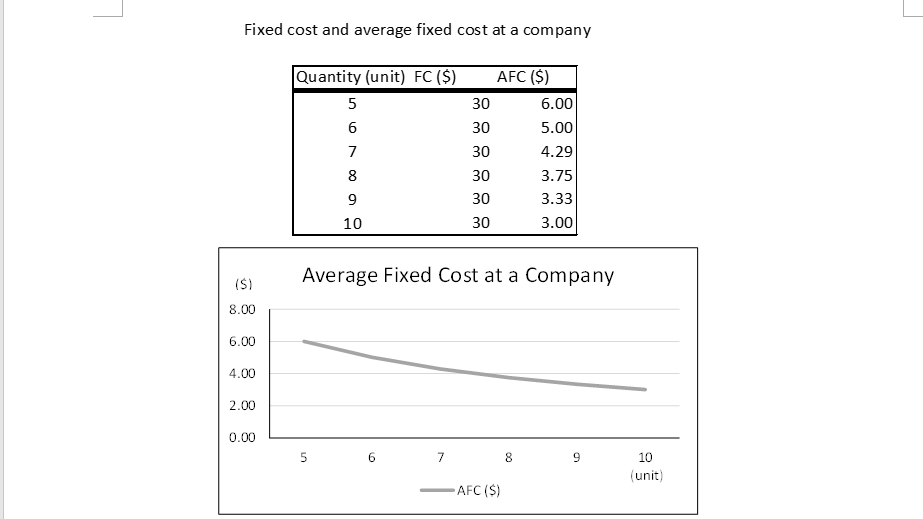
A table and graph of average fixed cost

=== Example 2 ===
In Example1, there was no information about average total cost and average variable cost. If the firm knows average total cost and average variable cost, it is possible to find the same result as Example 1. Because average total cost is average variable cost plus average fixed cost, average fixed cost is average total cost minus average variable cost. If producing 5 shirts generates an average total cost of 11 dollars and average variable cost of 5 dollars, the fixed cost would be 6 dollars. Similarly, the firm produces 10 shirts and average total cost and average variable cost is 10 dollars and 7 dollars respectively. In this case, the average fixed cost would be 3 dollars.

== Behavior ==
Average fixed cost always declines as output increases because fixed costs are spread across a larger number of units. The AFC curve is downward-sloping and approaches zero as output rises, since the denominator (quantity) grows while the fixed cost remains constant.

== See also ==
- Average variable cost
- Average cost
