= Unit cost =

Cost to produce, store and sell one unit of a particular product

The unit cost is the price incurred by a company to produce, store and sell one unit of a particular product. Unit costs include all fixed costs and all variable costs involved in production. Cost unit is a form of measurement of volume of production or service.

== Cost unit vs unit cost ==
Cost unit is the standard unit for buying the minimum of any product. Unit cost is the minimum cost for buying any standard unit.
