= Inflation =

Devaluation of money's purchasing power

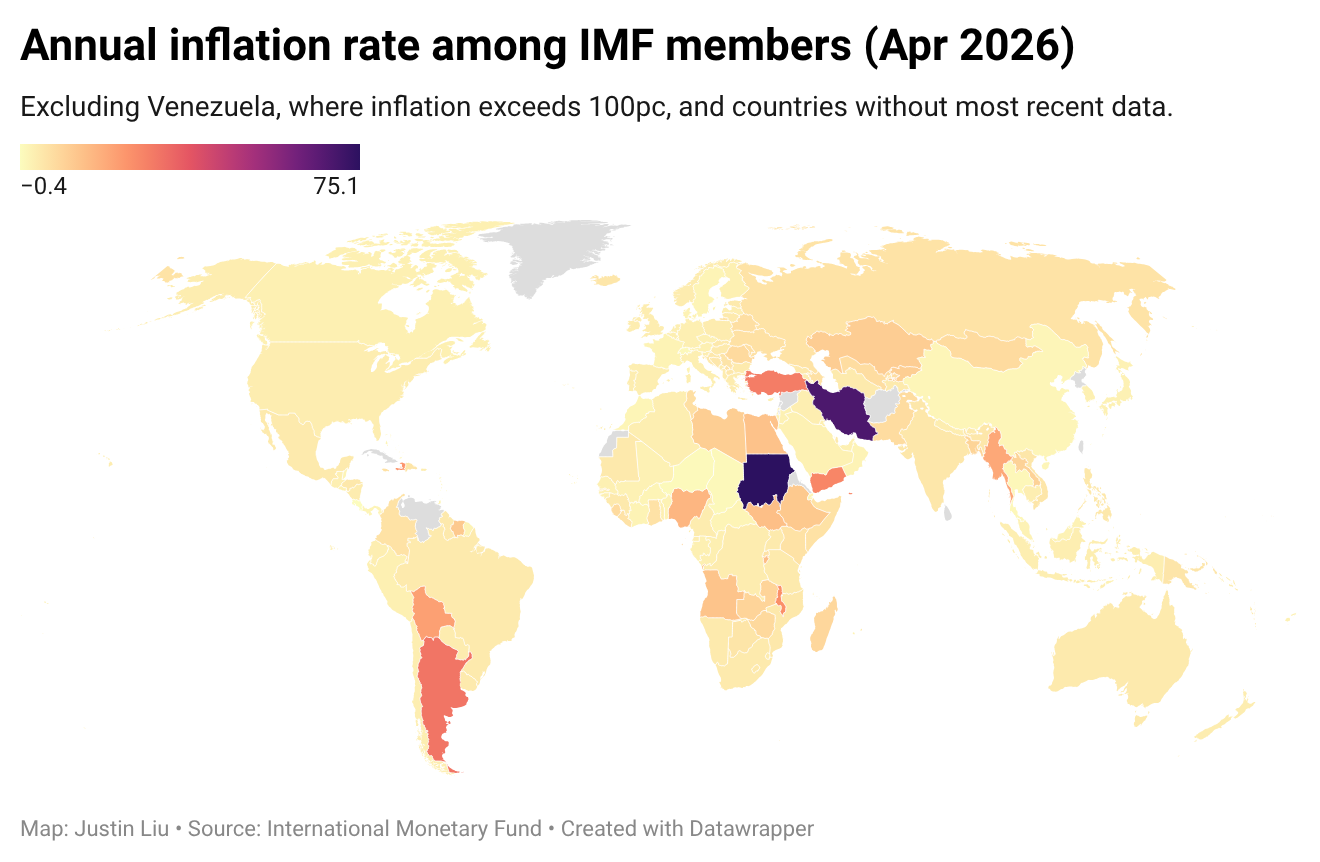
Global rates of inflation in October 2026 among International Monetary Fund members

UK and US monthly inflation rates from January 1989

In economics, inflation is an increase in the average price of goods and services in terms of money, though it originally referred to the increase of the money supply (monetary inflation) that can cause such a universal shift. This increase is measured using a price index, typically a consumer price index (CPI). When the general price level rises, each unit of currency buys fewer goods and services; consequently, inflation corresponds to a reduction in the purchasing power of money. The opposite of inflation is deflation, a decrease in the general price level of goods and services. The common measure of inflation is the inflation rate, the annualized percentage change in a general price index.

Changes in inflation are widely attributed to increases in the money supply, fluctuations in real demand for goods and services (also known as demand shocks, including changes in fiscal or monetary policy), changes in available supplies such as during energy crises (also known as supply shocks), significant decreases in interest rates set by the central bank, or changes in inflation expectations, which may be self-fulfilling.

Moderate inflation affects economies in both positive and negative ways. The negative effects would include an increase in the opportunity cost of holding money; incentivizing workers to switch jobs unnecessarily, making labor markets appear tight while average real wages fall; forcing workers into risky wage negotiations to keep pace, as purchasing power erodes between contracts; uncertainty over future inflation, which may discourage investment and savings; and, if inflation were rapid enough, shortages of goods as consumers begin hoarding out of concern that prices will increase in the future. Positive effects include reducing unemployment due to nominal wage rigidity, allowing the central bank greater freedom in carrying out monetary policy, encouraging loans and investment instead of money hoarding, and avoiding the inefficiencies associated with deflation.

Today, most economists favour a low and steady rate of inflation. Low (as opposed to zero or negative) inflation reduces the likelihood of economic recessions by enabling the labor market to adjust more quickly and reduces the risk that a liquidity trap prevents monetary policy from stabilizing the economy, while also avoiding the costs associated with high inflation. The task of keeping the rate of inflation low and stable is usually given to central banks that control monetary policy, normally through the setting of interest rates and by carrying out open market operations.

== Terminology ==
The term originates from the Latin inflare (to blow into or inflate). Conceptually, inflation refers to the general trend of prices, not changes in any specific price. For example, if people choose to buy more cucumbers than tomatoes, cucumbers consequently become more expensive and tomatoes less expensive. These changes are not related to inflation; they reflect a shift in tastes. Inflation is related to the value of currency itself. When currency was linked with gold, if new gold deposits were found, the price of gold and the value of currency would fall, and consequently, the prices of all other goods would become higher.

=== Classical economics ===
By the nineteenth century, economists categorised three separate factors that cause a rise or fall in the price of goods: a change in the value or production costs of the good, a change in the price of money which then was usually a fluctuation in the commodity price of the metallic content in the currency, and currency depreciation resulting from an increased supply of currency relative to the quantity of redeemable metal backing the currency. Following the proliferation of private banknote currency printed during the American Civil War, the term "inflation" started to appear as a direct reference to the currency depreciation that occurred as the quantity of redeemable banknotes outstripped the quantity of metal available for their redemption. At that time, the term inflation referred to the devaluation of the currency, and not to a rise in the price of goods. This relationship between the over-supply of banknotes and a resulting depreciation in their value was noted by earlier classical economists such as David Hume and David Ricardo, who would go on to examine and debate what effect a currency devaluation has on the price of goods.

=== Related concepts ===
Other economic concepts related to inflation include: deflation – a fall in the general price level; disinflation – a decrease in the rate of inflation; hyperinflation – an out-of-control inflationary spiral; stagflation – a combination of inflation, slow economic growth and high unemployment; reflation – an attempt to raise the general level of prices to counteract deflationary pressures; asset price inflation – a general rise in the prices of financial assets without a corresponding increase in the prices of goods or services; and agflation – an advanced increase in the price for food and industrial agricultural crops when compared with the general rise in prices.

More specific forms of inflation refer to sectors whose prices vary semi-independently from the general trend. "House price inflation" applies to changes in the house price index while "energy inflation" is dominated by the costs of oil and gas.

== History ==
US historical inflation (in blue) and deflation (in green) from the mid-17th century to the beginning of the 21st

=== Overview ===
Inflation has been a feature of history during the entire period when money has been used as a means of payment. One of the earliest documented inflations occurred in Alexander the Great's empire 330 BC. Historically, when commodity money was used, periods of inflation and deflation would alternate depending on the condition of the economy. However, when large, prolonged infusions of gold or silver into an economy occurred, this could lead to long periods of inflation.

The adoption of fiat currency by many countries, from the 18th century onwards, made much larger variations in the supply of money possible. Rapid increases in the money supply have taken place a number of times in countries experiencing political crises, producing hyperinflations – episodes of extreme inflation rates much higher than those observed in earlier periods of commodity money. The hyperinflation in the Weimar Republic of Germany is a notable example. The hyperinflation in Venezuela is the highest in the world, with an annual inflation rate of 833,997% as of October 2018.

Historically, inflations of varying magnitudes have occurred, interspersed with corresponding deflationary periods, from the price revolution of the 16th century, which was driven by the flood of gold and particularly silver seized and mined by the Spaniards in Latin America, to the largest paper money inflation of all time in Hungary after World War II.

However, since the 1980s, inflation has been held low and stable in countries with independent central banks. This has led to a moderation of the business cycle and a reduction in variation in most macroeconomic indicators – an event known as the Great Moderation.

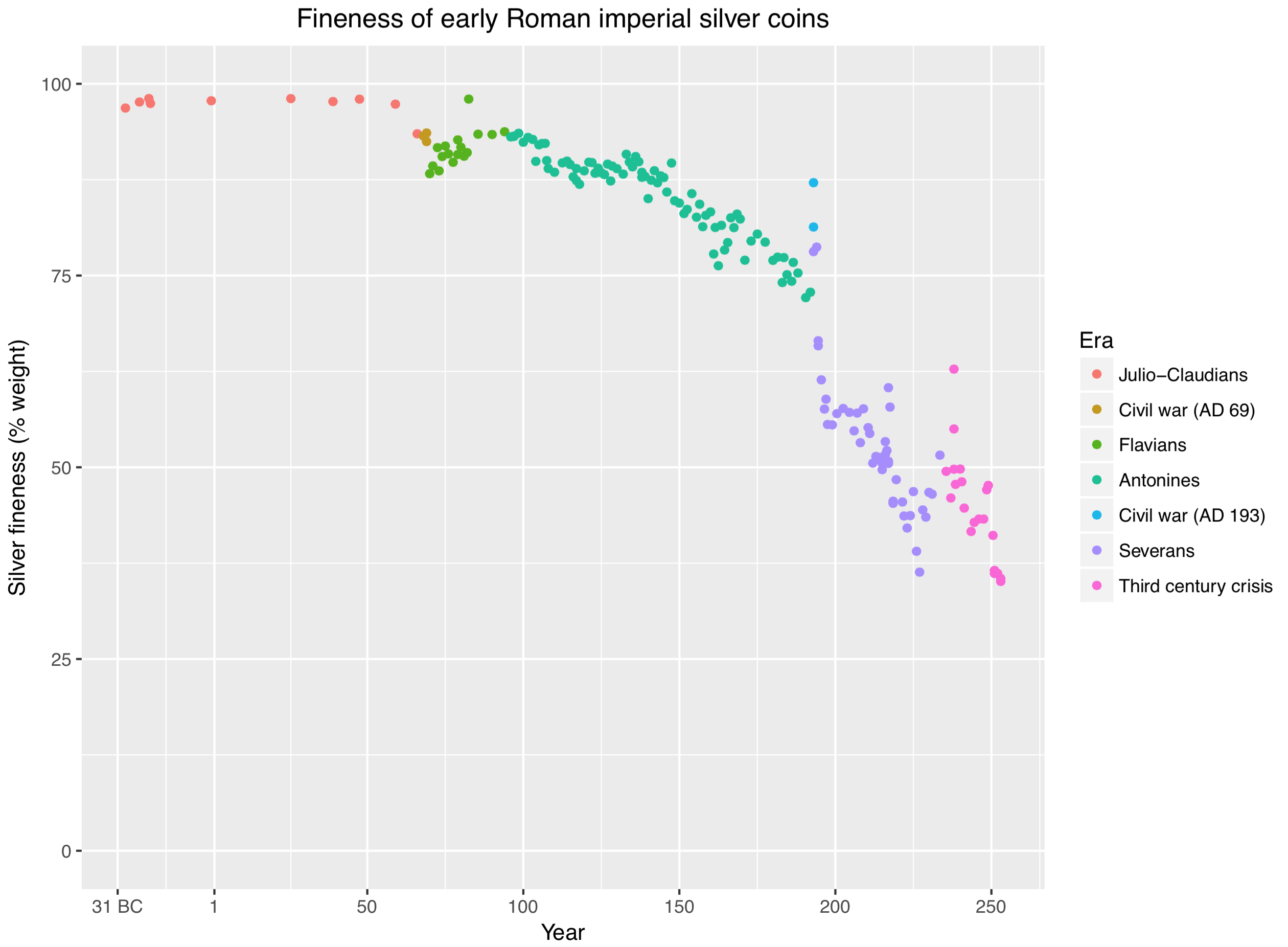
Silver purity through time in early Roman imperial silver coins. To increase the number of silver coins in circulation while short on silver, the Roman imperial government repeatedly debased the coins. They melted relatively pure silver coins and then struck new silver coins of lower purity but of nominally equal value. Silver coins were relatively pure before Nero (AD 54–68), but by the 270s had hardly any silver left.

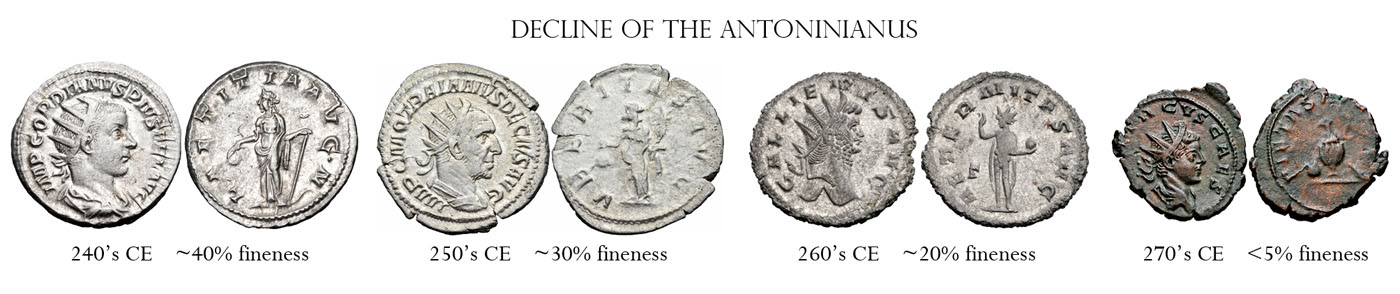
The silver content of Roman silver coins rapidly declined during the Crisis of the Third Century.

=== Ancient Europe ===
Alexander the Great's conquest of the Persian Empire in 330 BC was followed by one of the earliest documented inflation periods in the ancient world. Rapid increases in the overall money supply have occurred in many different societies throughout history, changing with different forms of money used. For instance, when silver was used as currency, the government could collect silver coins, melt them down, mix them with other, less valuable metals such as copper or lead and reissue them at the same nominal value, a process known as debasement. At the ascent of Nero as Roman emperor in AD 54, the denarius contained more than 90% silver, but by the 270s hardly any silver was left. By diluting the silver with other metals, the government could issue more coins without increasing the amount of silver used to make them. When the cost of each coin is lowered in this way, the government profits from an increase in seigniorage. This practice would increase the money supply but at the same time the relative value of each coin would be lowered. As the relative value of the coins becomes lower, consumers would need to give more coins in exchange for the same goods and services as before. These goods and services would experience a price increase as the value of each coin is reduced. Again at the end of the third century AD during the reign of Diocletian, the Roman Empire experienced rapid inflation.

=== Ancient China ===
Song dynasty China introduced the practice of printing paper money to create fiat currency. During the Mongol Yuan dynasty, the government spent a great deal of money fighting costly wars, and reacted by printing more money, leading to inflation. Fearing the inflation that plagued the Yuan dynasty, the Ming dynasty initially rejected the use of paper money, and reverted to using copper coins.

=== Medieval Egypt ===
During the Malian king Mansa Musa's hajj to Mecca in 1324, he was reportedly accompanied by a camel train that included thousands of people and nearly a hundred camels. When he passed through Cairo, he spent or gave away so much gold that it depressed its price in Egypt for over a decade, reducing its purchasing power. A contemporary Arab historian remarked about Mansa Musa's visit:

Gold was at a high price in Egypt until they came in that year. The mithqal did not go below 25 dirhams and was generally above, but from that time its value fell and it cheapened in price and has remained cheap till now. The mithqal does not exceed 22 dirhams or less. This has been the state of affairs for about twelve years until this day by reason of the large amount of gold which they brought into Egypt and spent there [...].

— Chihab Al-Umari, Kingdom of Mali

=== Medieval age and "price revolution" in Western Europe ===
There is no reliable evidence of inflation in Europe for the thousand years that followed the fall of the Roman Empire, but from the Middle Ages onwards reliable data do exist. Mostly, the medieval inflation episodes were modest, and there was a tendency for inflationary periods to be followed by deflationary periods.

From the second half of the 15th century to the first half of the 17th, Western Europe experienced a major inflationary cycle referred to as the "price revolution", with prices on average rising perhaps sixfold over 150 years. This is often attributed to the influx of gold and silver from the New World into Habsburg Spain, with wider availability of silver in previously cash-starved Europe causing widespread inflation. European population rebound from the Black Death began before the arrival of New World metal, and may have begun a process of inflation that New World silver compounded later in the 16th century.

=== After 1700 ===
The U.S. effective federal funds rate charted over fifty years

A pattern of intermittent inflation and deflation periods persisted for centuries until the Great Depression in the 1930s, which was characterized by major deflation. Since the Great Depression, however, there has been a general tendency for prices to rise every year. In the 1970s and early 1980s, annual inflation in most industrialized countries reached two digits (ten percent or more). The double-digit inflation era was of short duration, however, inflation by the mid-1980s returned to more modest levels. Amid this, general trends there have been spectacular high-inflation episodes in individual countries in interwar Europe, towards the end of the Nationalist Chinese government in 1948–1949, and later in some Latin American countries, in Israel, and in Zimbabwe. Some of these episodes are considered hyperinflation periods, normally designating inflation rates that surpass 50 percent monthly.

== Measures ==
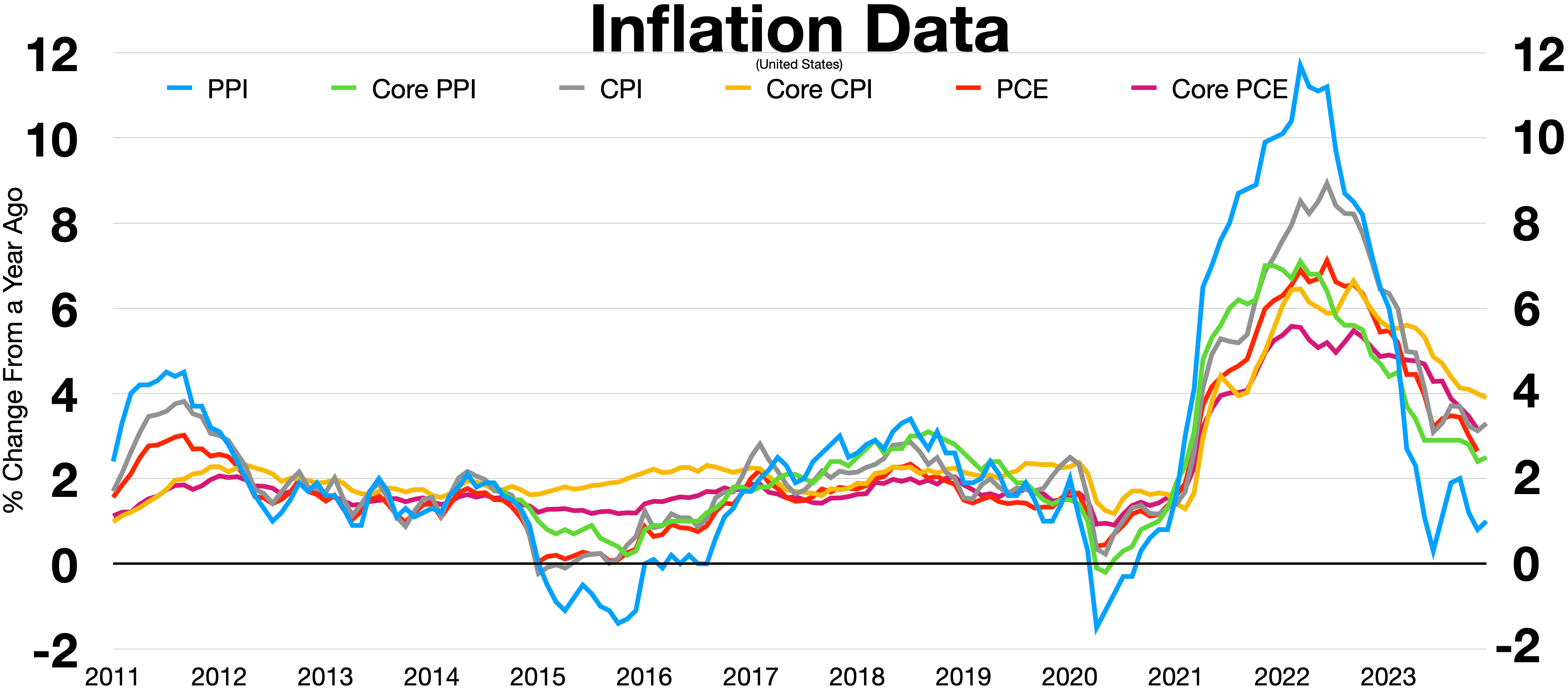
PPI is a leading indicator, CPI and PCE lag PPI Core PPI CPI Core CPI PCE Core PCE

Given that there are many possible measures of the price level, there are many possible measures of price inflation. Most frequently, the term "inflation" refers to a rise in a broad price index representing the overall price level for goods and services in the economy. The consumer price index (CPI), the personal consumption expenditures price index (PCEPI) and the GDP deflator are some examples of broad price indices. However, "inflation" may also be used to describe a rising price level within a narrower set of assets, goods or services within the economy, such as commodities (including food, fuel, metals), tangible assets (such as real estate), services (such as entertainment and health care), or labor. Although the values of capital assets are often casually said to "inflate," this should not be confused with inflation as a defined term; a more accurate description for an increase in the value of a capital asset is appreciation. The FBI (CCI), the producer price index, and employment cost index (ECI) are examples of narrow price indices used to measure price inflation in particular sectors of the economy. Core inflation is a measure of inflation for a subset of consumer prices that excludes food and energy prices, which rise and fall more than other prices in the short term. The Federal Reserve Board pays particular attention to the core inflation rate to get a better estimate of long-term future inflation trends overall.

The inflation rate is most widely calculated by determining the movement or change in a price index, typically the consumer price index.

The inflation rate is the percentage change of a price index over time. The Retail Prices Index is also a measure of inflation that is commonly used in the United Kingdom. It is broader than the CPI and contains a larger basket of goods and services. Inflation is politically driven, and policy can directly influence the trend of inflation.

The RPI is indicative of the experiences of a wide range of household types, particularly low-income households.

To illustrate the method of calculation, in January 2007, the U.S. Consumer Price Index was 202.416, and in January 2008 it was 211.080. The formula for calculating the annual percentage rate inflation in the CPI over the course of the year is: $\left(\frac{211.080-202.416}{202.416}\right)\times100\%=4.28\%$

The resulting inflation rate for the CPI in this one-year period is 4.28%, meaning the general level of prices for typical U.S. consumers rose by approximately four percent in 2007.

Other widely used price indices for calculating price inflation include the following:

- Producer price indices (PPIs) which measures average changes in prices received by domestic producers for their output. This differs from the CPI in that price subsidization, profits, and taxes may cause the amount received by the producer to differ from what the consumer paid. There is also typically a delay between an increase in the PPI and any eventual increase in the CPI. Producer price index measures the pressure being put on producers by the costs of their raw materials. This could be "passed on" to consumers, or it could be absorbed by profits, or offset by increasing productivity. In India and the United States, an earlier version of the PPI was called the Wholesale price index.
- Commodity price indices, which measure the price of a selection of commodities. In the present commodity price indices are weighted by the relative importance of the components to the "all in" cost of an employee.
- Core price indices: because food and oil prices can change quickly due to changes in supply and demand conditions in the food and oil markets, it can be difficult to detect the long run trend in price levels when those prices are included. Therefore, most statistical agencies also report a measure of 'core inflation', which removes the most volatile components (such as food and oil) from a broad price index like the CPI. Because core inflation is less affected by short run supply and demand conditions in specific markets, central banks rely on it to better measure the inflationary effect of current monetary policy.

Other common measures of inflation are:

- GDP deflator is a measure of the price of all the goods and services included in gross domestic product (GDP). The US Commerce Department publishes a deflator series for US GDP, defined as its nominal GDP measure divided by its real GDP measure.

∴ $\mbox{GDP Deflator} = \frac{\mbox{Nominal GDP}}{\mbox{Real GDP}}$

- Regional inflation The Bureau of Labor Statistics breaks down CPI-U calculations down to different regions of the US.
- Historical inflation Before collecting consistent econometric data became standard for governments, and for the purpose of comparing absolute, rather than relative standards of living, various economists have calculated imputed inflation figures. Most inflation data before the early 20th century is imputed based on the known costs of goods, rather than compiled at the time. It is also used to adjust for the differences in real standard of living for the presence of technology.
- Asset price inflation is an undue increase in the prices of real assets, such as real estate.

In some cases, the measures are meant to be more humorous or to reflect a single place. This includes:

- The Christmas Price Index, which calculates the cost of the items mentioned in a song, "The Twelve Days of Christmas".
- The Big Mac Index, which compares prices across countries.
- The Jollof index, which calculates the price of food needed to make a Jollof rice, a popular African dish.
- The Two Dishes One Soup Index, which calculates the price of food needed to cook one soup and two other dishes for a small family in Hong Kong.
- The Herengracht index, which calculates the price of housing in a fashionable neighborhood of Amsterdam.
- The Lipstick index, which claimed that when the economy got worse, small luxury sales, such as lipstick, would go up.

=== Issues in measuring ===
Measuring inflation in an economy requires objective means of differentiating changes in nominal prices on a common set of goods and services, and distinguishing them from those price shifts resulting from changes in value such as volume, quality, or performance. For example, if the price of a can of corn changes from $0.90 to $1.00 over the course of a year, with no change in quality, then this price difference represents inflation. This single price change would not, however, represent general inflation in an overall economy. Overall inflation is measured as the price change of a large "basket" of representative goods and services. This is the purpose of a price index, which is the combined price of a "basket" of many goods and services. The combined price is the sum of the weighted prices of items in the "basket". A weighted price is calculated by multiplying the unit price of an item by the number of that item the average consumer purchases. Weighted pricing is necessary to measure the effect of individual unit price changes on the economy's overall inflation. The consumer price index, for example, uses data collected by surveying households to determine what proportion of the typical consumer's overall spending is spent on specific goods and services, and weights the average prices of those items accordingly. Those weighted average prices are combined to calculate the overall price. To better relate price changes over time, indexes typically choose a "base year" price and assign it a value of 100. Index prices in subsequent years are then expressed in relation to the base year price. While comparing inflation measures for various periods one has to take into consideration the base effect as well.

Inflation measures are often modified over time, either for the relative weight of goods in the basket, or in the way in which goods and services from the present are compared with goods and services from the past. Basket weights are updated regularly, usually every year, to adapt to changes in consumer behavior. Sudden changes in consumer behavior can still introduce a weighting bias in inflation measurement. For example, during the COVID-19 pandemic it has been shown that the basket of goods and services was no longer representative of consumption during the crisis, as numerous goods and services could no longer be consumed due to government containment measures ("lock-downs").

Over time, adjustments are also made to the type of goods and services selected to reflect changes in the sorts of goods and services purchased by 'typical consumers'. New products may be introduced, older products disappear, the quality of existing products may change, and consumer preferences can shift. Different segments of the population may naturally consume different "baskets" of goods and services and may even experience different inflation rates. It is argued that companies have put more innovation into bringing down prices for wealthy families than for poor families.

Inflation numbers are often seasonally adjusted to differentiate expected cyclical cost shifts. For example, home heating costs are expected to rise in colder months, and seasonal adjustments are often used when measuring inflation to compensate for cyclical energy or fuel demand spikes. Inflation numbers may be averaged or otherwise subjected to statistical techniques to remove statistical noise and volatility of individual prices.

When looking at inflation, economic institutions may focus only on certain kinds of prices, or special indices, such as the core inflation index which is used by central banks to formulate monetary policy.

Most inflation indices are calculated from weighted averages of selected price changes. This necessarily introduces distortion, and can lead to legitimate disputes about what the true inflation rate is. This problem can be overcome by including all available price changes in the calculation, and then choosing the median value. In some other cases, governments may intentionally report false inflation rates; for instance, during the presidency of Cristina Kirchner (2007–2015) the government of Argentina was criticised for manipulating economic data, such as inflation and GDP figures, for political gain and to reduce payments on its inflation-indexed debt.

=== Official vs. true vs. perceived inflation ===
The true inflation is one percentage point lower than the official one, according to research. Therefore, the 2% inflation target is needed to prevent the true inflation being close to zero or even deflation. The reasons are the following:

- Substitution effect: People buy fewer products with the highest price rises and more of those whose prices have risen less. Therefore, the price of their non-fixed shopping basket rises less than that of a fixed shopping basket.
- Unobserved quality improvements: Even though statisticians try to take quality improvements into account, they are not able to do it fully. This is why people rather buy current products at the higher prices than old products at their old prices.
- New goods: The current shopping basket is much better, because it has goods that you previously could not even dream of.

Nevertheless, people overestimate the inflation even vs. the measured inflation. This is because they focus more on commonly-bought items than on durable goods, and more on price increases than on price decreases. On the other hand, different people have different shopping baskets and hence face different inflation rates.

Consumer price index by country in % (2024, relative to 2010): 100 to 110 110 to 120 120 to 130 130 to 140 140 to 150 / 150 to 200 200 to 300 300 to 1000 above 1000 no data

Cumulative inflation due to the compound effect can impact the perception of inflation.

=== Inflation expectations ===
Inflation expectations or expected inflation is the rate of inflation that is anticipated for some time in the foreseeable future. There are two major approaches to modeling the formation of inflation expectations. Adaptive expectations models them as a weighted average of what was expected one period earlier and the actual rate of inflation that most recently occurred. Rational expectations models them as unbiased, in the sense that the expected inflation rate is not systematically above or systematically below the inflation rate that actually occurs.

A long-standing survey of inflation expectations is the University of Michigan survey.

Inflation expectations affect the economy in several ways. They are more or less built into nominal interest rates, so that a rise (or fall) in the expected inflation rate will typically result in a rise (or fall) in nominal interest rates, giving a smaller effect if any on real interest rates. In addition, higher expected inflation tends to be built into the rate of wage increases, giving a smaller effect if any on the changes in real wages. Moreover, the response of inflationary expectations to monetary policy can influence the division of the effects of policy between inflation and unemployment (see monetary policy credibility).

== Causes ==
=== Historical approaches ===
Theories of the origin and causes of inflation have existed since at least the 16th century. Two competing theories, the quantity theory of money and the real bills doctrine, appeared in various guises during century-long debates on recommended central bank behaviour. In the 20th century, Keynesian, monetarist and new classical (also known as rational expectations) views on inflation dominated post-World War II macroeconomics discussions, which were often heated intellectual debates, until some kind of synthesis of the various theories was reached by the end of the century.

==== Before 1936 ====
The price revolution from ca. 1550–1700 caused several thinkers to present what is now considered to be early formulations of the quantity theory of money (QTM). Other contemporary authors attributed rising price levels to the debasement of national coinages. Later research has shown that also growing output of Central European silver mines and an increase in the velocity of money because of innovations in the payment technology, in particular the increased use of bills of exchange, contributed to the price revolution.

An alternative theory, the real bills doctrine (RBD), originated in the 17th and 18th century, receiving its first authoritative exposition in Adam Smith's The Wealth of Nations. It asserts that banks should issue their money in exchange for short-term real bills of adequate value. As long as banks only issue a dollar in exchange for assets worth at least a dollar, the issuing bank's assets will naturally move in step with its issuance of money, and the money will hold its value. Should the bank fail to get or maintain assets of adequate value, then the bank's money will lose value, just as any financial security will lose value if its asset backing diminishes. The real bills doctrine (also known as the backing theory) thus asserts that inflation results when money outruns its issuer's assets. The quantity theory of money, in contrast, claims that inflation results when money outruns the economy's production of goods.

During the 19th century, three different schools debated these questions: The British Currency School upheld a quantity theory view, believing that the Bank of England's issues of bank notes should vary one-for-one with the bank's gold reserves. In contrast to this, the British Banking School followed the real bills doctrine, recommending that the bank's operations should be governed by the needs of trade: Banks should be able to issue currency against bills of trading, i.e. "real bills" that they buy from merchants. A third group, the Free Banking School, held that competitive private banks would not overissue, even though a monopolist central bank could be believed to do it.

The debate between currency, or quantity theory, and banking schools during the 19th century prefigures current questions about the credibility of money in the present. In the 19th century, the banking schools had greater influence in policy in the United States and Great Britain, while the currency schools had more influence "on the continent", that is in non-British countries, particularly in the Latin Monetary Union and the Scandinavian Monetary Union.

During the Bullionist Controversy during the Napoleonic Wars, David Ricardo argued that the Bank of England had engaged in over-issue of bank notes, leading to commodity price increases. In the late 19th century, supporters of the quantity theory of money led by Irving Fisher debated with supporters of bimetallism. Later, Knut Wicksell sought to explain price movements as the result of real shocks rather than movements in money supply, resounding statements from the real bills doctrine.

In 2019, monetary historians Thomas M. Humphrey and Richard Timberlake published "Gold, the Real Bills Doctrine, and the Fed: Sources of Monetary Disorder 1922–1938".

==== Keynes and the early Keynesians ====
John Maynard Keynes in his 1936 main work The General Theory of Employment, Interest and Money emphasized that wages and prices were sticky in the short run, but gradually responded to aggregate demand shocks. These could arise from many different sources, e.g. autonomous movements in investment or fluctuations in private wealth or interest rates. Economic policy could also affect demand, monetary policy by affecting interest rates and fiscal policy either directly through the level of government final consumption expenditure or indirectly by changing disposable income via tax changes.

The various sources of variations in aggregate demand will cause cycles in both output and price levels. Initially, a demand change will primarily affect output because of the price stickiness, but eventually prices and wages will adjust to reflect the change in demand. Consequently, movements in real output and prices will be positively, but not strongly, correlated.

Keynes' propositions formed the basis of Keynesian economics which came to dominate macroeconomic research and economic policy in the first decades after World War II.Other Keynesian economists developed and reformed several of Keynes' ideas. Importantly, Alban William Phillips in 1958 published indirect evidence of a negative relation between inflation and unemployment, confirming the Keynesian emphasis on a positive correlation between increases in real output (normally accompanied by a fall in unemployment) and rising prices, i.e. inflation. Phillips' findings were confirmed by other empirical analyses and became known as a Phillips curve. It quickly became central to macroeconomic thinking, apparently offering a stable trade-off between price stability and employment. The curve was interpreted to imply that a country could achieve low unemployment if it were willing to tolerate a higher inflation rate or vice versa.

The Phillips curve model described the U.S. experience well in the 1960s but failed to describe the stagflation experienced in the 1970s.

==== Monetarism ====
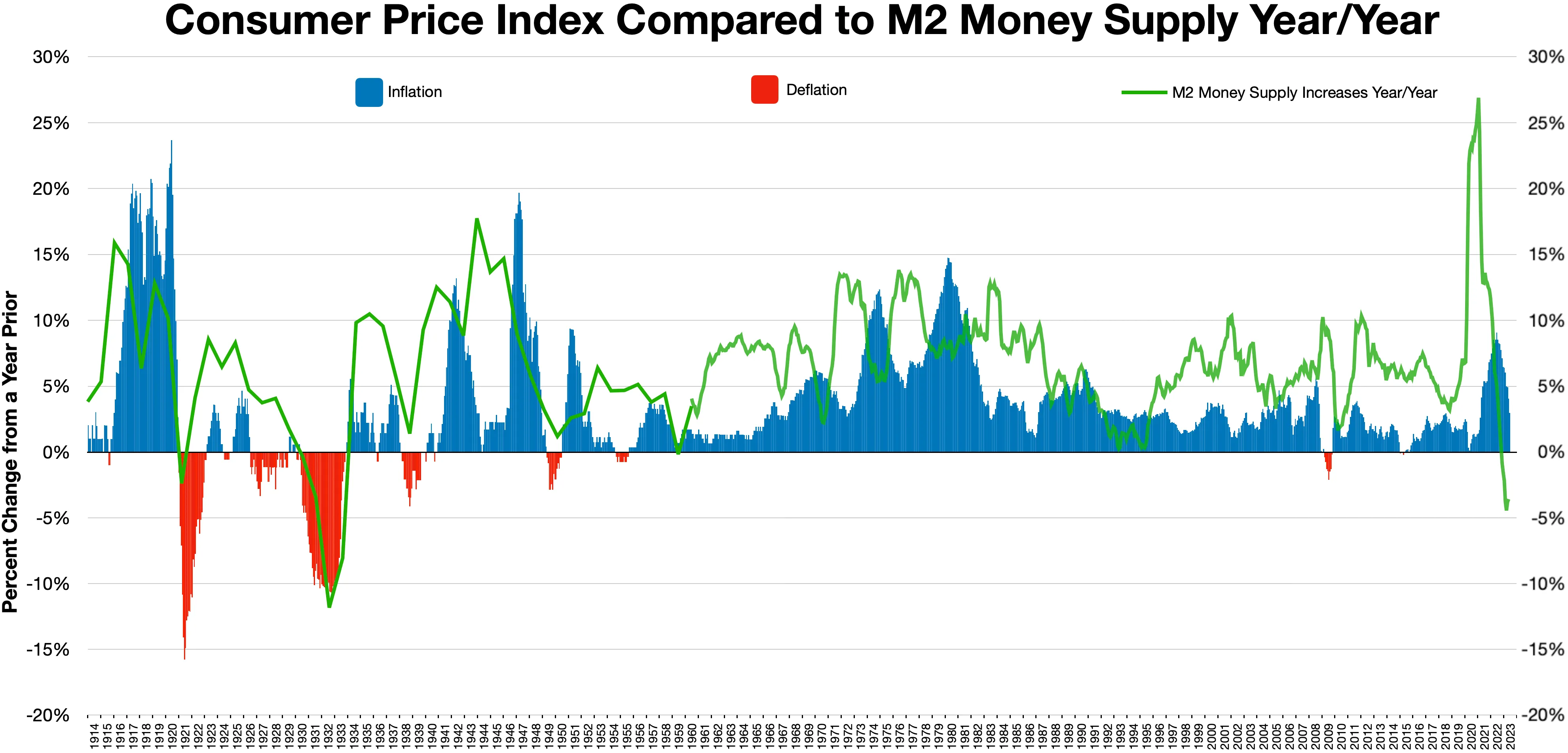
Inflation Deflation M2 money supply increases Year/Year

Inflation and the growth of money supply (M2)

During the 1960s the Keynesian view of inflation and macroeconomic policy altogether were challenged by monetarist theories, led by Milton Friedman.Friedman famously stated that:

Inflation is always and everywhere a monetary phenomenon.

He revived the quantity theory of money by Irving Fisher and others, making it into a central tenet of monetarist thinking, arguing that the most significant factor influencing inflation or deflation is how fast the money supply grows or shrinks.

The quantity theory of money, simply stated, says that any change in the amount of money in a system will change the price level. This theory begins with the equation of exchange:

$$MV = PQ,$$

where

$M$ is the nominal quantity of money;
$V$ is the velocity of money in final expenditures;
$P$ is the general price level;
$Q$ is an index of the real value of final expenditures.

In this formula, the general price level is related to the level of real economic activity (Q), the quantity of money (M) and the velocity of money (V). The formula itself is simply an uncontroversial accounting identity because the velocity of money (V) is defined residually from the equation to be the ratio of final nominal expenditure ($PQ$) to the quantity of money (M).

Monetarists assumed additionally that the velocity of money is unaffected by monetary policy (at least in the long run), that the real value of output is also exogenous in the long run, its long-run value being determined independently by the productive capacity of the economy, and that money supply is exogenous and can be controlled by the monetary authorities. Under these assumptions, the primary driver of the change in the general price level is changes in the quantity of money.Consequently, monetarists contended that monetary policy, not fiscal policy, was the most potent instrument to influence aggregate demand, real output and eventually inflation. This was contrary to Keynesian thinking which in principle recognized a role for monetary policy, but in practice believed that the effect from interest rate changes to the real economy was slight, making monetary policy an ineffective instrument, preferring fiscal policy.Conversely, monetarists considered fiscal policy, or government spending and taxation, as ineffective in controlling inflation.

Friedman also took issue with the traditional Keynesian view concerning the Phillips curve. He, together with Edmund Phelps, contended that the trade-off between inflation and unemployment implied by the Phillips curve was only temporary, but not permanent. If politicians tried to exploit it, it would eventually disappear because higher inflation would over time be built into the economic expectations of households and firms.This line of thinking led to the concept of potential output (sometimes called the "natural gross domestic product"), a level of GDP where the economy is stable in the sense that inflation will neither decrease nor increase. This level may itself change over time when institutional or natural constraints change. It corresponds to the Non-Accelerating Inflation Rate of Unemployment, NAIRU, or the "natural" rate of unemployment (sometimes called the "structural" level of unemployment). If GDP exceeds its potential (and unemployment consequently is below the NAIRU), the theory says that inflation will accelerate as suppliers increase their prices. If GDP falls below its potential level (and unemployment is above the NAIRU), inflation will decelerate as suppliers attempt to fill excess capacity, cutting prices and undermining inflation.

==== Rational expectations theory ====
In the early 1970s, rational expectations theory led by economists like Robert Lucas, Thomas Sargent and Robert Barro transformed macroeconomic thinking radically. They held that economic actors look rationally into the future when trying to maximize their well-being, and do not respond solely to immediate opportunity costs and pressures.In this view, future expectations and strategies are important for inflation as well. One implication was that agents would anticipate the likely behaviour of central banks and base their own actions on these expectations. A central bank having a reputation of being "soft" on inflation will generate high inflation expectations, which again will be self-fulfilling when all agents build expectations of future high inflation into their nominal contracts like wage agreements. On the other hand, if the central bank has a reputation of being "tough" on inflation, then such a policy announcement will be believed and inflationary expectations will come down rapidly, thus allowing inflation itself to come down rapidly with minimal economic disruption. The implication is that credibility becomes very important for central banks in fighting inflation.

==== New Keynesians ====
Events during the 1970s proved Milton Friedman and other critics of the traditional Phillips curve right: The relation between the inflation rate and the unemployment rate broke down. Eventually, a consensus was established that the break-down was due to agents changing their inflation expectations, confirming Friedman's theory. As a consequence, the notion of a natural rate of unemployment (alternatively called the structural rate of unemployment) was accepted by most economists, meaning that there is a specific level of unemployment that is compatible with stable inflation. Stabilization policy must therefore try to steer economic activity so that the actual unemployment rate converges towards that level.The trade-off between the unemployment rate and inflation implied by Phillips thus holds in the short term, but not in the long term. Also the oil crises of the 1970s causing at the same time rising unemployment and rising inflation (i.e. stagflation) led to a broad recognition by economists that supply shocks could independently affect inflation.

During the 1980s a group of researchers named new Keynesians emerged who accepted many originally non-Keynesian concepts like the importance of monetary policy, the existence of a natural level of unemployment and the incorporation of rational expectations formation as a reasonable benchmark. At the same time they believed, like Keynes did, that various market imperfections in different markets like labour markets and financial markets were also important to study to understand both inflation generation and business cycles.During the 1980s and 1990s, there were often heated intellectual debates between new Keynesians and new classicals, but by the 2000s, a synthesis gradually emerged. The result has been called the new Keynesian model,the "new neoclassical synthesis" or simply the "new consensus" model.

=== View post-2000 to present ===
A common view beginning around the year 2000 and holding through to the present time on inflation and its causes can be illustrated by a modern Phillips curve including a role for supply shocks and inflation expectations beside the original role of aggregate demand (determining employment and unemployment fluctuations) in influencing the inflation rate. Consequently, demand shocks, supply shocks and inflation expectations are all potentially important determinants of inflation, confirming the basis of the older triangle model by Robert J. Gordon:

- Demand shocks may both decrease and increase inflation. So-called demand-pull inflation may be caused by increases in aggregate demand due to increased private and government spending, etc. Conversely, negative demand shocks may be caused by contractionary economic policy.
- Supply shocks may also lead to both higher or lower inflation, depending on the character of the shock. Cost-push inflation is caused by a drop in aggregate supply (potential output). This may be due to natural disasters, war or increased prices of inputs. For example, a sudden decrease in the supply of oil, leading to increased oil prices, can cause cost-push inflation. Producers for whom oil is a part of their costs could then pass this on to consumers in the form of increased prices.
- Inflation expectations play a major role in forming actual inflation. High inflation can prompt employees to demand rapid wage increases to keep up with consumer prices. In this way, rising wages in turn can help fuel inflation as firms pass these higher labor costs on to their customers as higher prices, leading to a feedback loop. In the case of collective bargaining, wage growth may be set as a function of inflationary expectations, which will be higher when inflation is high. This can cause a wage-price spiral. In a sense, inflation begets further inflationary expectations, which beget further (built-in) inflation.

The important role of rational expectations is recognized by the emphasis on credibility on the part of central banks and other policy-makers. The monetarist assertion that monetary policy alone could successfully control inflation formed part of the new consensus which recognized that both monetary and fiscal policy are important tools for influencing aggregate demand.Indeed, monetary policy is under normal circumstances considered to be the preferable instrument to contain inflation. At the same time, most central banks have abandoned trying to target money growth as originally advocated by the monetarists. Instead, most central banks in developed countries focus on adjusting interest rates to achieve an explicit inflation target.The reason for central bank reluctance in following money growth targets is that the money stock measures that central banks can control tightly, e.g. the monetary base, are not very closely linked to aggregate demand, whereas conversely money supply measures like M2, which are in some cases more closely correlated with aggregate demand, are difficult to control for the central bank. Also, in many countries the relationship between aggregate demand and all money stock measures have broken down in recent decades, weakening further the case for monetary policy rules focusing on the money supply. On November 18 2026, Federal Reserve Governor Christopher Waller said inflation was spreading into the services sector, rather than being driven mainly by rising energy prices. Waller said businesses were getting use to increasing prices by about 3% and passing the extra costs on the customers, which could make it harder to get inflation under control.

However, while more disputed in the 1970s, surveys of members of the American Economic Association (AEA) since the 1990s have shown that most professional American economists generally agree with the statement "Inflation is caused primarily by too much growth in the money supply", while the same surveys have shown a lack of consensus by AEA members since the 1990s that "In the short run, a reduction in unemployment causes the rate of inflation to increase" has developed despite more agreement with the statement in the 1970s.

Housing shortages, immigration and climate change have been cited as significant drivers of inflation in the 21st century.

==== Climate change ====
Through its influence on food production and supply chains, climate change has been found to contribute to inflation, a phenomenon that is increasingly being referred to as "climateflation". The phrase, which was first used by Isabel Schnabel of the European Central Bank, refers to price rises that are directly caused by climate-related disruptions such intense heat, droughts, and floods that have an impact on agricultural productivity. One noteworthy instance happened in 2022–2023. Researchers calculated that climate-driven heat increases in Europe—averaging 1.25°C above baseline, with peaks of up to 5.7°C in some regions—contributed to an increase in European food prices of about 0.7%, which in turn added about 0.3% to overall inflation. This impact exacerbated inflationary pressures already present as a result of the COVID-19 rebound and the shock to oil prices that followed Russia's invasion of Ukraine. According to the same study, warming predicted by 2035 could increase these effects by 30–50%.

==== Energy prices ====
Fossilflation is a term that describes the impact of fossil fuels on inflation.

According to Vox in August 2022, "Economists have pointed to energy prices as the main reason for high inflation", noting that "energy prices indirectly affect virtually every part of the economy". Sectors that raise prices significantly as a result of higher fossil fuel prices include transportation, food, and shipping.

==== 2021–2023 inflation surge ====
Most countries experienced the 2021–2023 inflation surge, peaking in 2022 and declining in 2023. The causes are believed to be a mixture of demand and supply shocks, whereas inflation expectations generally remained anchored. Possible causes on the demand side include expansionary fiscal and monetary policy after the COVID-19 pandemic, whereas supply shocks include the 2021–2023 global supply chain crisis caused by the COVID-19 lockdowns and the global energy crisis that was exacerbated by the 2022 Russian invasion of Ukraine.

The term sellers' inflation was coined during this period to describe the effect of corporate profits as a possible cause of inflation: Price inelasticity can contribute to inflation when firms consolidate, tending to support monopoly or monopsony conditions anywhere along the supply chain for goods or services. When this occurs, firms can provide greater shareholder value by taking a larger proportion of profits than by investing in providing greater volumes of their outputs. Shortly after initial energy price shocks caused by the Russian invasion of Ukraine had subsided, oil companies found that supply chain constrictions, already exacerbated by the ongoing global pandemic, supported price inelasticity, i.e., they began lowering prices to match the price of oil when it fell much more slowly than they had increased their prices when costs rose.

The quantity theory of money has long been popular with libertarian-conservative critics of the Federal Reserve. During the COVID pandemic and its immediate aftermath, the M2 money supply increased at the fastest rate in decades, leading some to link the growth to the 2021-2023 inflation surge. Fed chairman Jerome Powell said in December 2021 that the once-strong link between the money supply and inflation "ended about 40 years ago," due to financial innovations and deregulation. Previous Fed chairs Ben Bernanke and Alan Greenspan, had previously concurred with this position. The broadest measure of money supply, M2, increased about 45% from 2010 through 2015, far faster than GDP growth, yet the inflation rate declined during that period — the opposite of what monetarism would have predicted. A lower velocity of money than was historically the case was also cited for a diminished effect of growth in the money supply on inflation.

Surveys of economists conducted by the University of Chicago Booth School of Business in November 2021 and January 2022 showed that more economists agreed than disagreed (with many expressing uncertainty) that while contributing to rising prices in the United States, the global supply chain crisis would not contribute to a higher long-term inflation rate above the Federal Reserve's inflation target and was not the main driver of the inflation surge, but that the combined effect of the stimulative fiscal and monetary policies being implemented in the United States posed a risk of prolonged higher inflation.

=== Heterodox views ===
Additionally, there are theories about inflation accepted by economists outside of the mainstream. The Austrian School stresses that inflation is not uniform over all assets, goods, and services. Inflation depends on differences in markets and on where newly created money and credit enter the economy. Ludwig von Mises said that inflation should refer to an increase in the quantity of money, that is not offset by a corresponding increase in the need for money, and that price inflation will necessarily follow, always leaving a poorer nation.

=== Government debt ===
Government debt obligates the government to increase taxes, reduce spending or the government may resort to inflationary finance of the deficit. Another direction which translates government debt to inflation is the motivation of governments to erode nominal debts by increasing inflation. As a result, elevated debt heightens the risk of inflationary pressures in both the short and long run by boosting aggregate demand, shaping inflation expectations, crowding out private investment, and raising concerns about fiscal dominance. It was found that in the short run, a permanent 1 percent of GDP increase in the primary deficit leads, after five years, to inflationary pressures equivalent to a $300–$1,250 loss in household purchasing power per household (in 2024 dollars).

== Effects of inflation ==
=== General effect ===
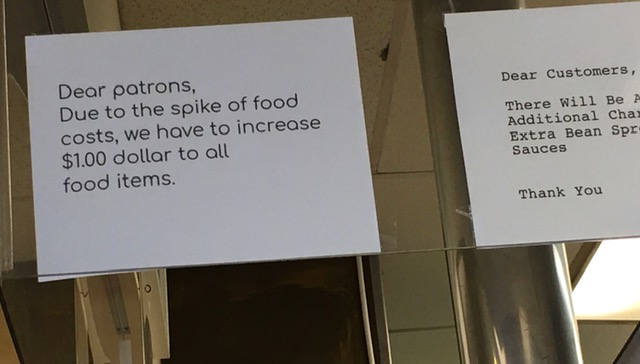
Restaurant increasing prices by $1.00 due to inflation

Inflation is the decrease in the purchasing power of a currency. That is, when the general level of prices rise, each monetary unit can buy fewer goods and services in aggregate. The effect of inflation differs on different sectors of the economy, with some sectors being adversely affected while others benefitting. For example, with inflation, those segments in society which own physical assets, such as property, stock etc., benefit from the price/value of their holdings going up, when those who seek to acquire them will need to pay more for them. Their ability to do so will depend on the degree to which their income is fixed. For example, increases in payments to workers and pensioners often lag behind inflation, and for some people income is fixed. Also, individuals or institutions with cash assets will experience a decline in the purchasing power of the cash. Increases in the price level (inflation) erode the real value of money (the functional currency) and other items with an underlying monetary nature.

Debtors who have debts with a fixed nominal rate of interest will see a reduction in the "real" interest rate as the inflation rate rises. The real interest on a loan is the nominal rate minus the inflation rate. The formula R = N-I approximates the correct answer as long as both the nominal interest rate and the inflation rate are small. The correct equation is r = n/i where r, n and i are expressed as ratios (e.g. 1.2 for +20%, 0.8 for −20%). As an example, when the inflation rate is 3%, a loan with a nominal interest rate of 5% would have a real interest rate of approximately 2% (in fact, it's 1.94%). Any unexpected increase in the inflation rate would decrease the real interest rate. Banks and other lenders adjust for this inflation risk either by including an inflation risk premium to fixed interest rate loans or lending at an adjustable rate.

=== Negative ===
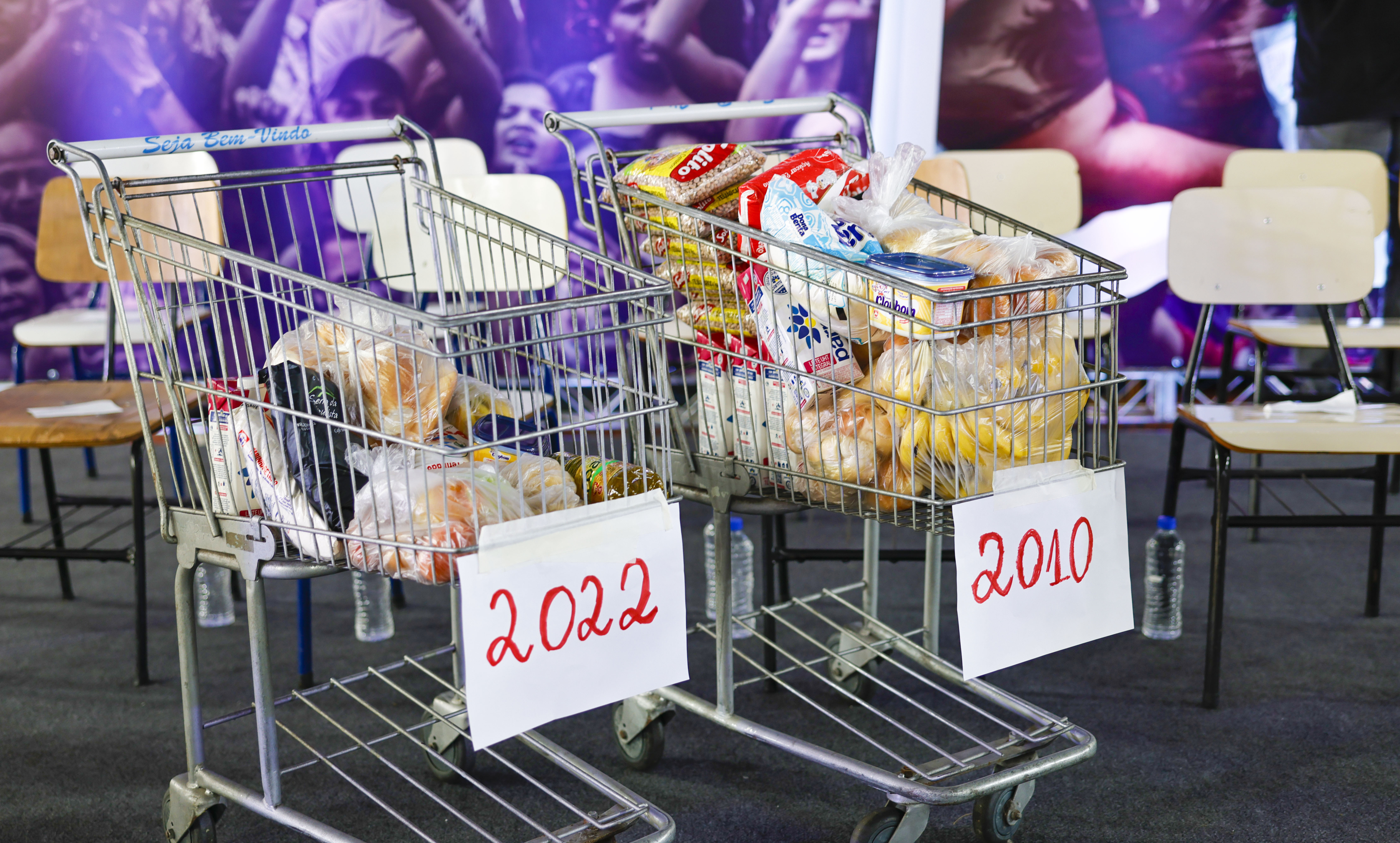
Inflation is illustrated by the contrast between what R$100 could buy in 2010 and in 2022, observed by Lula during a meeting with women in Brasilândia.

High or unpredictable inflation rates are regarded as harmful to an overall economy. They add inefficiencies in the market and make it difficult for companies to budget or plan long-term. Inflation can act as a drag on productivity as companies are forced to shift resources away from products and services to focus on profit and losses from currency inflation. Uncertainty about the future purchasing power of money discourages investment and saving. Inflation hurts asset prices such as stock performance in the short-run, as it erodes non-energy corporates' profit margins and leads to central banks' policy tightening measures. Inflation can also impose hidden tax increases. For instance, inflated earnings push taxpayers into higher income tax rates unless the tax brackets are indexed to inflation.

With high inflation, purchasing power is redistributed from those on fixed nominal incomes, such as some pensioners whose pensions are not indexed to the price level, towards those with variable incomes whose earnings may better keep pace with the inflation. This redistribution of purchasing power will also occur between international trading partners. Where fixed exchange rates are imposed, higher inflation in one economy than another will cause the first economy's exports to become more expensive and affect the balance of trade. There can also be negative effects to trade from an increased instability in currency exchange prices caused by unpredictable inflation.

Hoarding
People buy durable and/or non-perishable commodities and other goods as stores of wealth, to avoid the losses expected from the declining purchasing power of money, creating shortages of the hoarded goods.

Social unrest and revolts
Inflation can lead to massive demonstrations and revolutions. Thomas Sargent, showed how the huge public debt hoarded by Louis XVI stimulated the French revolution. After the revolution, inflation replaced debt as a tool for financing the debt. The post-revolution hyperinflation is considered as one of the reason for the rise of Napoleon. Likewise, the German hyperinflation is considered to be one of the reason for the rise of the Nazi party. Inflation and in particular food inflation is considered one of the main reasons that caused the 2010–2011 Tunisian revolution and the 2011 Egyptian revolution, according to many observers including Robert Zoellick, president of the World Bank. Tunisian president Zine El Abidine Ben Ali was ousted, Egyptian President Hosni Mubarak was also ousted after only 18 days of demonstrations, and protests soon spread in many countries of North Africa and Middle East. The high inflation in Iran, especially of food is considered as one of the main reasons for the 2025-2026 mass protests in Iran.

Hyperinflation
If inflation becomes too high, it can cause people to severely curtail their use of the currency, leading to an acceleration in the inflation rate. High and accelerating inflation grossly interferes with the normal workings of the economy, hurting its ability to supply goods. Hyperinflation can lead people to abandon the use of the country's currency in favour of external currencies (dollarization), as has been reported to have occurred in North Korea.

Allocative efficiency
A change in the supply or demand for a good will normally cause its relative price to change, signaling the buyers and sellers that they should re-allocate resources in response to the new market conditions. But when prices are constantly changing due to inflation, price changes due to genuine relative price signals are difficult to distinguish from price changes due to general inflation, so agents are slow to respond to them. The result is a loss of allocative efficiency.

Shoe leather cost
High inflation increases the opportunity cost of holding cash balances and can induce people to hold a greater portion of their assets in interest paying accounts. However, since cash is still needed to carry out transactions this means that more "trips to the bank" are necessary to make withdrawals, proverbially wearing out the "shoe leather" with each trip.

Menu cost

With high inflation, firms must change their prices often to keep up with economy-wide changes. But often changing prices is itself a costly activity whether explicitly, as with the need to print new menus, or implicitly, as with the extra time and effort needed to change prices constantly.

Tax
Inflation serves as a hidden tax on currency holdings.

=== Positive ===
Labour-market adjustments
Nominal wages are slow to adjust downward. This can lead to prolonged disequilibrium and high unemployment in the labor market. Since inflation allows real wages to fall even if nominal wages are kept constant, moderate inflation enables labor markets to reach equilibrium faster.

Room to maneuver
The primary tools for controlling the money supply are the ability to set the discount rate, the rate at which banks can borrow from the central bank, and open market operations, which are the central bank's interventions into the bonds market with the aim of affecting the nominal interest rate. If an economy finds itself in a recession with already low, or even zero, nominal interest rates, then the bank cannot cut these rates further (since negative nominal interest rates are impossible) to stimulate the economy – this situation is known as a liquidity trap.

Mundell–Tobin effect
According to the Mundell–Tobin effect, an increase in inflation leads to an increase in capital investment, which leads to an increase in growth. The Nobel laureate Robert Mundell noted that moderate inflation would induce savers to substitute lending for some money holding as a means to finance future spending. That substitution would cause market clearing real interest rates to fall. The lower real rate of interest would induce more borrowing to finance investment. In a similar vein, Nobel laureate James Tobin noted that such inflation would cause businesses to substitute investment in physical capital (plant, equipment, and inventories) for money balances in their asset portfolios. That substitution would mean choosing the making of investments with lower rates of real return. (The rates of return are lower because the investments with higher rates of return were already being made before.) The two related effects are known as the Mundell–Tobin effect. Unless the economy is already overinvesting according to models of economic growth theory, that extra investment resulting from the effect would be seen as positive.

Instability with deflation
Economist S.C. Tsiang noted that once substantial deflation is expected, two important effects will appear; both a result of money holding substituting for lending as a vehicle for saving. The first was that continually falling prices and the resulting incentive to hoard money will cause instability resulting from the likely increasing fear, while money hoards grow in value, that the value of those hoards are at risk, as people realize that a movement to trade those money hoards for real goods and assets will quickly drive those prices up. Any movement to spend those hoards "once started would become a tremendous avalanche, which could rampage for a long time before it would spend itself." Thus, a regime of long-term deflation is likely to be interrupted by periodic spikes of rapid inflation and consequent real economic disruptions. The second effect noted by Tsiang is that when savers have substituted money holding for lending on financial markets, the role of those markets in channeling savings into investment is undermined. With nominal interest rates driven to zero, or near zero, from the competition with a high return money asset, there would be no price mechanism in whatever is left of those markets. With financial markets effectively euthanized, the remaining goods and physical asset prices would move in perverse directions. For example, an increased desire to save could not push interest rates further down (and thereby stimulate investment) but would instead cause additional money hoarding, driving consumer prices further down and making investment in consumer goods production thereby less attractive. Moderate inflation, once its expectation is incorporated into nominal interest rates, would give those interest rates room to go both up and down in response to shifting investment opportunities, or savers' preferences, and thus allow financial markets to function in a more normal fashion.

=== Cost-of-living allowance ===
The real purchasing power of fixed payments is eroded by inflation unless they are inflation-adjusted to keep their real values constant. In many countries, employment contracts, pension benefits, and government entitlements (such as social security) are tied to a cost-of-living index, typically to the consumer price index. A cost-of-living adjustment (COLA) adjusts salaries based on changes in a cost-of-living index. It does not control inflation, but rather seeks to mitigate the consequences of inflation for those on fixed incomes. Salaries are typically adjusted annually in low inflation economies. During hyperinflation they are adjusted more often. They may also be tied to a cost-of-living index that varies by geographic location if the employee moves.

Annual escalation clauses in employment contracts can specify retroactive or future percentage increases in worker pay which are not tied to any index. These negotiated increases in pay are colloquially referred to as cost-of-living adjustments ("COLAs") or cost-of-living increases because of their similarity to increases tied to externally determined indexes.

== Control of inflation ==
Monetary policy is the policy enacted by the monetary authorities (most frequently the central bank of a nation) to accomplish their objectives. Among these, keeping inflation at a low and stable level is often a prominent objective, either directly via inflation targeting or indirectly, e.g. via a fixed exchange rate against a low-inflation currency area.

=== Historical approaches to inflation control ===
Historically, central banks and governments have followed various policies to achieve low inflation, employing various nominal anchors. Before World War I, the gold standard was prevalent, but was eventually found to be detrimental to economic stability and employment, not least during the Great Depression in the 1930s. For the first decades after World War II, the Bretton Woods system initiated a fixed exchange rate system for most developed countries, tying their currencies to the US dollar, which again was directly convertible to gold. The system disintegrated in the 1970s, however, after which the major currencies started floating against each other. During the 1970s many central banks turned to a money supply target recommended by Milton Friedman and other monetarists, aiming for a stable growth rate of money to control inflation. However, it was found to be impractical because of the unstable relationship between monetary aggregates and other macroeconomic variables, and was eventually abandoned by all major economies. In 1990, New Zealand as the first country ever adopted an official inflation target as the basis of its monetary policy, continually adjusting interest rates to steer the country's inflation rate towards its official target. The strategy was generally considered to work well, and central banks in most developed countries have over the years adopted a similar strategy. As of 2023, the central banks of all G7 member countries can be said to follow an inflation target, including the European Central Bank and the Federal Reserve, who have adopted the main elements of inflation targeting without officially calling themselves inflation targeters. In emerging countries fixed exchange rate regimes are still the most common monetary policy.

=== Fixed exchange rates ===
Under a fixed exchange rate currency regime, a country's currency is tied in value to another single currency or to a basket of other currencies. A fixed exchange rate is usually used to stabilize the value of a currency, vis-a-vis the currency it is pegged to. It can also be used as a means to control inflation if the currency area tied to itself maintains low and stable inflation. However, as the value of the reference currency rises and falls, so does the currency pegged to it. This essentially means that the inflation rate in the fixed exchange rate country is determined by the inflation rate of the country the currency is pegged to. In addition, a fixed exchange rate prevents a government from using domestic monetary policy to achieve macroeconomic stability.

As of 2023, Denmark is the only OECD country which maintains a fixed exchange rate (against the euro), but it is frequently used as a monetary policy strategy in developing countries.

=== Gold standard ===
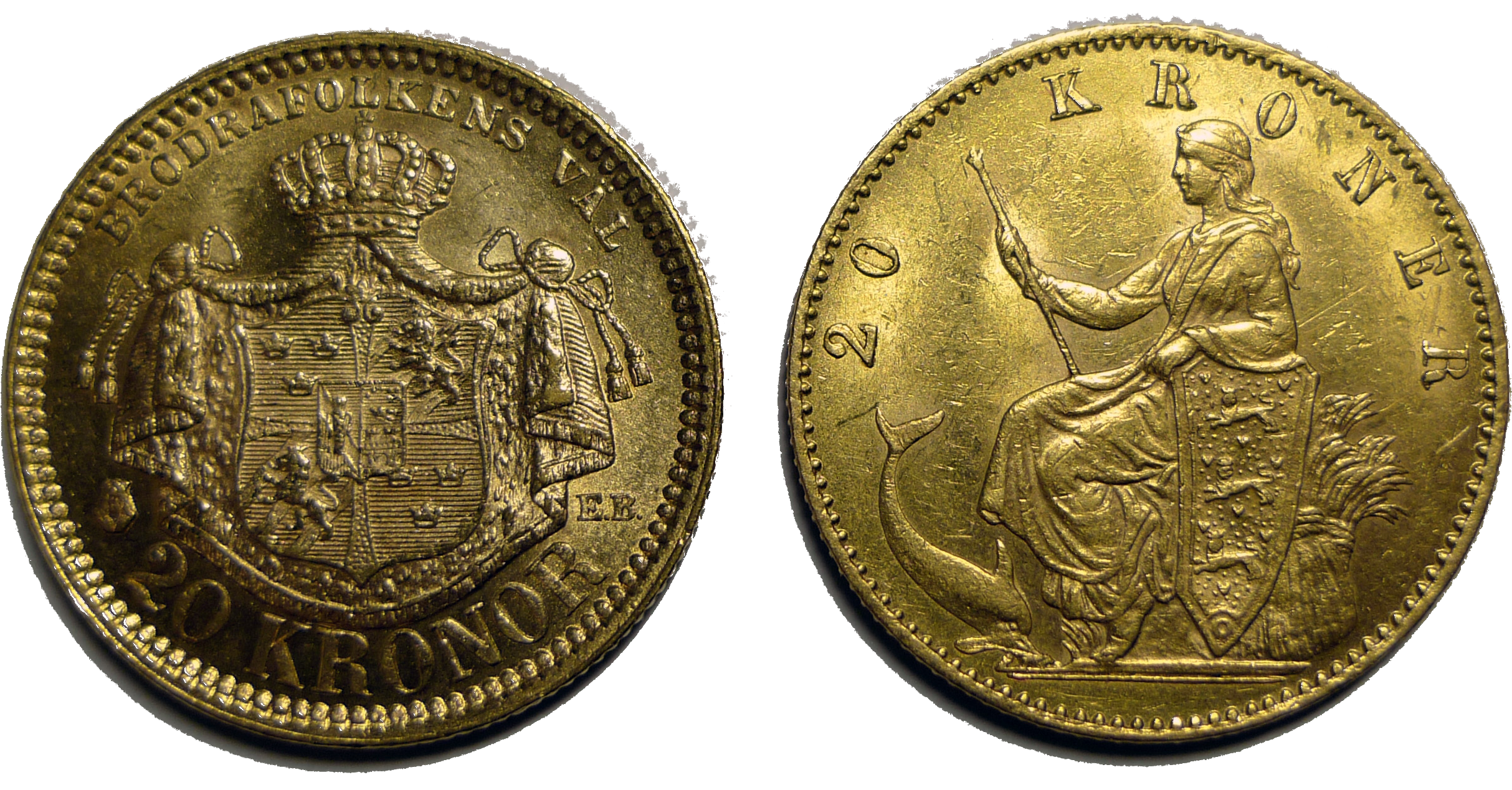
Two 20 krona gold coins from the Scandinavian Monetary Union, a historical example of an international gold standard

The gold standard is a monetary system in which a region's common medium of exchange is paper notes (or other monetary token) that are normally freely convertible into pre-set, fixed quantities of gold. The standard specifies how the gold backing would be implemented, including the amount of specie per currency unit. The currency itself has no innate value but is accepted by traders because it can be redeemed for the equivalent value of the commodity (specie). A U.S. silver certificate, for example, could be redeemed for an actual piece of silver.

Under a gold standard, the long term rate of inflation (or deflation) would be determined by the growth rate of the supply of gold relative to total output. Critics argue that this will cause arbitrary fluctuations in the inflation rate, and that monetary policy would essentially be determined by an intersection of however much new gold was produced by mining and changing demand for gold for practical uses. The gold standard was historically found to make it more difficult to stabilize employment levels and avoid recessions and was eventually abandoned everywhere.

=== Demurrage currency ===
Freiwirtschaft economists theorize that demurrage currency could eliminate both inflation and deflation. There tends to be some interest cost that is built into the goods and services that consumers tend to purchase,so if demurrage currency eliminates interest rates, then prices are less likely to increase. Demurrage would also naturally cause the money supply to decrease, thus causing deflation. If a central bank issues and monitors demurrage currency as Gesell originally proposed, then it could replace all the money that disappears due to demurrage by printing money at a similar rate. The money printing could create just enough inflation to cancel out the natural deflation of demurrage, thus achieving an inflation target of 0%.

=== Inflation targeting ===
From its first inception in New Zealand in 1990, direct inflation targeting as a monetary policy strategy has spread to become prevalent among developed countries. The basic idea is that the central bank perpetually adjusts the bank rate to influence the country's inflation rate towards its official target. Changes in interest rates affect aggregate demand, aggregate supply and inflation in various ways, also called the monetary transmission mechanism. The relation between unemployment and inflation is known as the Phillips curve.

In most OECD countries, the inflation target is about 2%. Citizens show generally a high aversion to inflation. On average voters prefer an inflation rate around 0%.

=== Government policy ===
The government can prevent inflation with public policy, fiscal policy and regulatory changes which increase supply or reduce demand in targeted sectors. Government budget balance tends to reduce inflation.

Another method attempted in the past have been price controls. Economists generally advise against the imposition of price controls due to resulting shortages. Price controls with rationing have been used successfully in wartime environments. However, their use in other contexts is far more mixed. Notable failures of their use include the 1972 imposition of wage and price controls by Richard Nixon.

The reduction of sales tax or value-added tax can reduce the prices in a competitive market.

== See also ==
- Artificial scarcity
- Core inflation
- Cost of living
- Cumulative process
- Fisher equation
- Food prices
- Hyperinflation
- Indexed unit of account
- Inflationism
- Inflation accounting
- Inflation beta
- Inflation derivative
- Inflation hedge
- Headline inflation
- Measuring economic worth over time
- Overconsumption
- Real versus nominal value (economics)
- Shrinkflation and Skimpflation
- Secular inflation
- Steady-state economy
- Stealth inflation
- Supply shock
- Welfare cost of inflation
