= Food price crisis =

A food price crisis is a label for abnormal changes in the food marketplace that negatively impact food security. There is no universally accepted definition.

Recent international events described as food price crises include:

- 2007–2008 world food price crisis
- 2011 East Africa drought
- 2010–12 world food price crisis
- Food security during the COVID-19 pandemic
- World food crises (2022–2023)
- 2026 Iran war fuel crisis
