= Secular inflation =

Secular inflation is a prolonged period of gentle or mild price increases. Secular, or chronic, inflation is creeping inflation that continues to persist over a long period of time. Creeping inflation is the gradual, rather than drastic, increase in prices. Although most commonly used to describe a mild inflation rate, secular inflation can be used to describe most inflation rates that are spread over long periods of time. This type of inflation can be consistent (without many downward movements) or intermittent (occurring at regular intervals).

== Causes ==
Friedrich-Karl Lage, the economist credited with coining the term secular inflation, described three causes for secular inflation. These are: outside influences, the wear-and-tear on money-stabilizing institutions, and human conduct. Other factors contributing to secular inflation are production and distribution, as costs of production and investments that take a long time to mature prolong rising prices and inflation rates. A final cause of secular inflation is consumption behavior, especially when people live beyond their means as a result of the Duessenberry effect.

== See also ==
- Inflation
- Interest rate
- Exchange rate
- Macroeconomics
