= Food prices =

Average price level for food across countries, regions and on a global scale

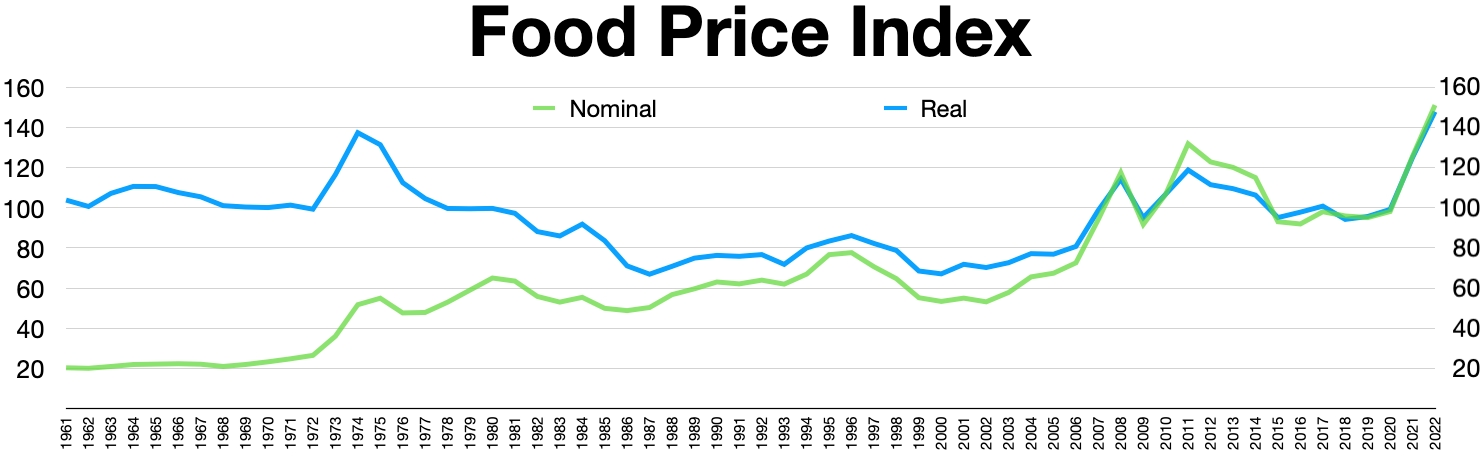
The Food and Agriculture Organization (FAO) Food Price Index 1961–2021 in nominal and real terms. The Real Price Index is the Nominal Price Index deflated by the World Bank Manufactures Unit Value Index (MUV). Years 2014–2016 is 100.

Food prices refer to the average price level for food across countries, regions and on a global scale. Food prices affect producers and consumers of food. Price levels depend on the food production process, including food marketing and food distribution. Fluctuation in food prices is determined by a number of compounding factors. Geopolitical events, global demand, exchange rates, government policy, diseases and crop yield, energy costs, availability of natural resources for agriculture, food speculation, changes in the use of soil and weather events directly affect food prices. To a certain extent, adverse price trends can be counteracted by food politics.

The consequences of food price fluctuation are multiple. Increases in food prices, or agflation, endangers food security, particularly for developing countries, and can cause social unrest. Increases in food prices is related to disparities in diet quality and health, particularly among vulnerable populations, such as women and children.

Food prices will on average continue to rise due to a variety of reasons. Growing world population will put more pressure on the supply and demand. Climate change will increase extreme weather events, including droughts, storms and heavy rain, and overall increases in temperature will affect food production.

An intervention to reduce food loss or waste, if sufficiently large, will affect prices upstream and downstream in the supply chain relative to where the intervention occurred. "The CPI (Consumer Price Index) for all food increased 0.8% from July 2022 to August 2022, and food prices were 11.4% higher than in August 2021."

== Factors ==
=== Energy costs ===
World population supported with and without synthetic nitrogen fertilizers

Food production is a very energy-intensive process. Energy is used in the raw materials for fertilizers to powering the facilities needed to process the food. Increases in the price of energy leads to an increase in the price of food. Oil prices also affect the price of food. Food distribution is also affected by increases in oil prices, leading to increases in the price of food.

=== Weather events and climate change ===
Adverse weather events such as droughts or heavy rain can cause harvest failure. There is evidence that extreme weather events and natural disasters cause increased food prices. Climate change will increase extreme weather events, including droughts, storms and heavy rain, and overall increases in temperature will affect food production.

Water is a necessary natural resource for organic life making it an essential component in producing goods that sustains human life. For example, a continuing drought in South Africa may - amongst other factors - have food inflation soar 11% until end of 2016 according to the South African Reserve Bank. A drought turns fresh water into a rare commodity making it hard to come by in food production, thus inflating food prices.

=== Global markets ===
Shocks to global food commodity markets give rise to significant price effects, which can transmit to domestic markets, driving food insecurity and adverse nutrition outcomes. The lower the buffer capacity of a market, the higher the price spike. Trade expansion can contribute towards global markets that are more resilient to shocks. Global food and agricultural markets are operating in an era of heightened uncertainty driven by extreme weather events, financial disturbances, geopolitical tensions and conflicts, pandemics, outbreaks of diseases and pests, energy price fluctuations, and socioeconomic crises. These shocks affect supply, demand, prices and trade flows, and their effects can be transitory or persistent. Global food and agricultural trade has proven resilient, but shocks can still lead to substantial short-term disruptions. So far, these effects have been transitory, pointing to the capacity of the global markets to absorb, adapt to and recover from shocks. However, even short-term effects can give rise to significant food security risks.

Global food trade networks have become denser and more interconnected, with countries trading with a larger number of partners than in the past. This increased connectivity enhances resilience by providing alternative sourcing options when disruptions occur. Nevertheless, cereal trade networks remain highly concentrated. Only a few exporters account for a large share of global cereal exports, creating efficiency gains under normal conditions but significant vulnerabilities under stress.

In the event of a shock, trade policies by major players aiming to insulate domestic markets test the resilience of global food commodity markets. Export restrictions withdraw supplies from the global market, while import facilitation strengthens demand. This further exacerbates the shock’s effect on world prices, driving them higher. Food stocks are an integral component of resilience strategies. Maintaining large buffer stocks to stabilize domestic prices distorts markets and has proven to be highly costly and fiscally unsustainable. Emergency food reserves, combined with well‐targeted social protection measures, such as cash transfers and food assistance, have proven to be more effective in protecting vulnerable populations during crises.

== Global differences ==
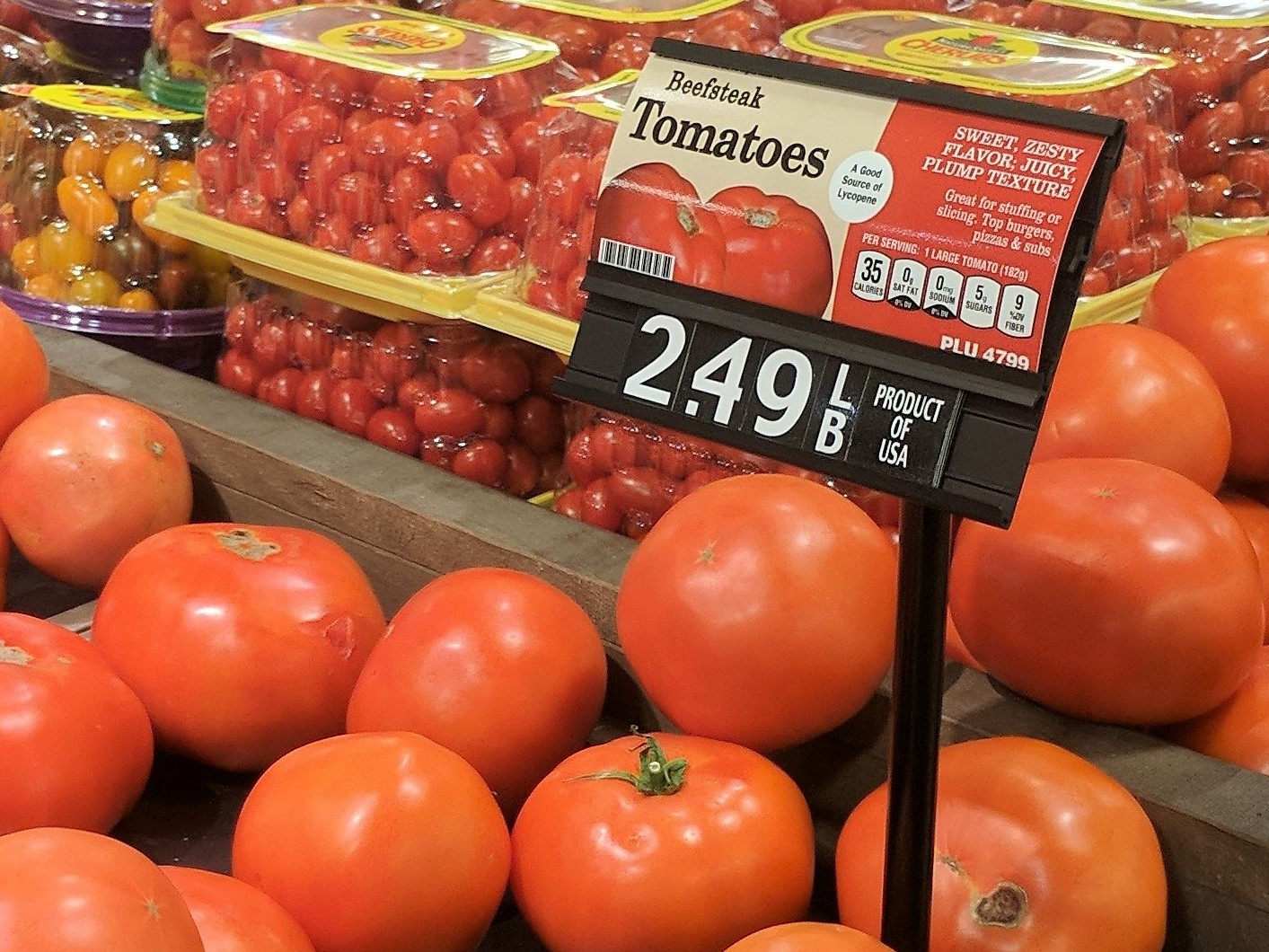
Food pricing for tomatoes given in US dollars per pound

Food price inflation was the highest in low-income countries, 2019–2024

The price of food has risen quite drastically during the 2007–08 and the 2010–2012 world food price crises. It has been most noticeable in developing countries while less so in the OECD countries and North America.

Consumer prices in the rich countries are massively influenced by the power of discount stores and constitute only a small part of the entire cost of living. In particular, Western pattern diet constituents like those that are processed by fast food chains are comparatively cheap in the Western hemisphere. Profits rely primarily on quantity (see mass production), less than high-price quality. For some product classes like dairy or meat, overproduction has twisted the price relations in a way utterly unknown in underdeveloped countries ("butter mountain"). The situation for poor societies is worsened by certain free trade agreements that allow easier export of food in the "southern" direction than vice versa. A striking example can be found in tomato exports from Italy to Ghana by virtue of the Economic Partnership Agreements where the artificially cheap vegetables play a significant role in the destruction of indigenous agriculture and a corresponding further decline in the already ailing economic power.

While median global food price inflation rose from 2.3% in December 2020 to 13.6% in January 2023, low-income countries experienced significantly steeper increases, with inflation peaking at 30% in May 2023. This trend has undermined household purchasing power, with likely consequences for food security and nutrition. High food price inflation may worsen food security, particularly in low-income countries. A 10% increase in food prices is associated with a 3.5% rise in moderate to severe food insecurity, and a 1.8% increase in severe food insecurity. At the peak of inflation, 65% of low-income and 61% of lower-middle-income countries, home to 1.5 billion people, faced food price inflation above 10%, deepening inequalities.

Year-on-year global average food price inflation increased from 5.8% in December 2020 to 23.3% in December 2022. These figures are heavily influenced by countries that experienced hyperinflation, such as the Sudan, Venezuela, and Zimbabwe, where year-on-year inflation peaks reached levels well above 350%. Using the median provides a more accurate reflection of global inflation levels: median food price inflation increased sharply from 2.3% in December 2020 to 13.6% in January 2023.

Vulnerable groups, especially women and rural populations, are disproportionately affected due to limited resources, weaker social protection mechanisms, and fewer coping strategies. Child malnutrition can worsen with food price inflation. The 2021 to 2023 food price surge is associated with higher rates of wasting among children under five years of age. A 10% increase in food prices is associated with a 2.7% to 4.3% rise in overall wasting and a 4.8% to 6.1% increase in severe wasting among children under five years of age.

Rising staple food prices have put additional pressure on the diets of low-income households. From 2019 to 2024, the steepest food price increase sin countries like Mexico, Nigeria and Pakistan were in starchy staple foods and oils. As starchy staple foods form the core of diets for the poorest households, such increases can undermine food security and nutrition; however, access to low-cost items in other food groups may help sustain dietary adequacy despite food price inflation.

Relative food prices across food groups and processing levels remained fairly stable globally between 2011 and 2021. Nutrient-dense foods such as fruits and vegetables continue to be the most expensive per kilocalorie. In general, ultra-processed foods tend to have lower prices per kilocalorie compared to less processed alternatives. Ultra-processed foods are increasingly displacing more nutritious alternatives despite growing evidence of their adverse health impacts.

Food price inflation has been particularly acute in Low Income Countries (LICs). Most households, even those dependent on agriculture for their livelihoods, rely on markets for their food supplies. Market-based food sourcing leaves households vulnerable to sharp price increases, exacerbating food insecurity, deepening poverty, and limiting access to and consumption of healthy diets. Smallholder farmers and agricultural labourers are often net food buyers, so rising food prices typically outweigh any income gains they receive from selling their produce.

In more unequal countries, weaker social protection systems, limited fiscal space, and larger vulnerable populations leave disadvantaged groups, especially women and rural households, at greater risk. Gender-based constraints, such as lower earnings, caregiving responsibilities, and restricted access to resources, reduce women’s capacity to cope with inflation, often forcing them to cut back on food intake during crises.

Controlling for access to essential services, including clean water, sanitation, and public health services, a 10% increase in food prices is associated with a 2.7% to 4.3% rise in wasting prevalence and a 4.8% to 6.1% increase in severe wasting among children under five years of age.

== Monitoring ==
The Food and Agriculture Organization (FAO) of the United Nations has developed an "early warning tool" called the Food Price and Monitoring Analysis (FPMA). After the food crisis of 2008 and 2011, FAO developed an "early warning indicator to detect abnormal growth in prices in consumer markets in the developing world". The FPMA uses a variety of data sources to feed their database.

Fluctuating food prices have led to some initiative in the industrialized world as well. In Canada, Dalhousie University and the University of Guelph publish Canada's Food Price Report every year, since 2010. Read by millions of people every year, the report monitors and forecasts food prices for the coming year. The report was created by Canadian researchers Sylvain Charlebois and Francis Tapon.

== Measurements ==
=== Numbeo ===
The Numbeo database "allows you to see, share and compare information about food prices worldwide and gives estimation of minimum money needed for food per person per day".

=== FAO food price index ===
Food, meat, dairy, cereals, vegetable oil, and sugar price indices, deflated using the World Bank Manufactures Unit Value Index (MUV). The peaks in 2008 and 2011 indicate global food crises.

The FAO food price index is a measure of the monthly change in international prices of a market basket of food commodities. It consists of the average of five commodity group price indices, weighted with the average export shares of each of the groups.

1. FAO Cereal price index
2. FAO Vegetable oil price index
3. FAO Dairy price index
4. FAO Meat price index
5. FAO Sugar Price index

Year	nominal price idx	deflated price idx
1990	107.2	100.4
1991	105.0	98.7
1992	109.2	101.1
1993	105.5	97.1
1994	110.3	101.3
1995	125.3	105.3
1996	131.1	113.7
1997	120.3	111.3
1998	108.6	105.6
1999	93.2	92.6
2000	91.1	92.4
2001	94.6	101.0
2002	89.6	96.2
2003	97.7	98.1
2004	112.7	105.0
2005	118.0	106.8
2006	127.2	112.7
2007	161.4	134.6
2008	201.4	155.7
2009	160.3	132.8
2010	188.0	150.7
2011	229.9	169.1
2012	213.3	158.8
2013	209.8	158.5
2014	201.8	152.0
2015	164.0	123.2
2016	151.6	112.3

=== World bank food price watch ===
The World Bank releases the quarterly Food Price Watch report which highlights trends in domestic food prices in low- and middle-income countries, and outlines the (food) policy implications of food price fluctuations.

There are also some ways of measuring food prices that are more humorous. These include:

- The Big Mac Index, which compares the price of a McDonald's Big Mac hamburger across countries.
- The Jollof index, which calculates the price of food needed to make a Jollof rice, a popular African dish.
- The Two Dishes One Soup Index, which calculates the price of food needed to cook one soup and two other dishes for a small family in Hong Kong.
- The "Charlotte Index", which calculates the cost of ingredients for making an apple charlotte in Russia.

== 21st century price history ==
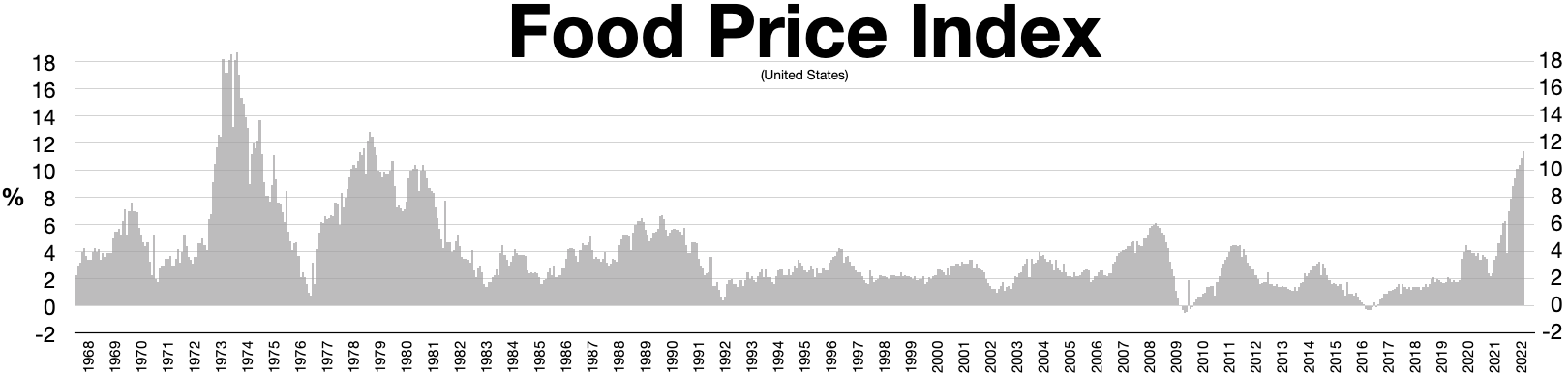
Food Price Index United States

Distinctive trajectories of food security and food price inflation, 2015–2023.

Relationship between food insecurity and food prices, 2014–2024.

It is rare for price spikes to hit all major foods in most countries at once, but food prices suffered all-time peaks in 2008 and 2011, posting a 15% and 12% deflated increase year-over-year, representing prices higher than any data collected. One reason for the increase in food prices may be the increase in oil prices at the same time.

It is rare for the spikes to hit all major foods in most countries at once. Food prices rose 4% in the United States in 2007, the highest increase since 1990, and are expected to climb as much again in 2008. As of December 2007, 37 countries faced food crises, and 20 had imposed some sort of food-price controls. In China, the price of pork jumped 58% in 2007. In the 1980s and 1990s, farm subsidies and support programs allowed major grain exporting countries to hold large surpluses which could be tapped during food shortages to keep prices down. However, new trade policies have made agricultural production much more responsive to market demands, putting global food reserves at their lowest since 1983.

Food prices are rising, wealthier Asian consumers are westernizing their diets, and farmers and nations of the third world are struggling to keep up the pace. Asian nations have contributed at a more rapid growth rate in the past five years to the global fluid and powdered milk manufacturing industry. In 2008, this accounted for more than 30% of production with China accounting for more than 10% of both production and consumption in the global fruit and vegetable processing and preserving industry. The trend is similarly evident in industries such as soft drink and bottled water manufacturing, as well as global cocoa, chocolate, and sugar confectionery manufacturing.

Rising food prices over recent years have been linked with social unrest around the world, including rioting in Bangladesh and Mexico, and the Arab Spring.

In 2013, Overseas Development Institute researchers showed that rice has more than doubled in price since 2000, rising by 120% in real terms. This was as a result of shifts in trade policy and restocking by major producers. More fundamental drivers of increased prices are the higher costs of fertilizer, diesel and labor. Parts of Asia see rural wages rise with potentially large benefits for the 1.3 billion (2008 estimate) of Asia's poor in reducing the poverty they face. However, this harms more vulnerable groups who don't share in the economic boom, especially in Asian and African coastal cities. The researchers said the threat means social-protection policies are needed to guard against price shocks. The research proposed that in the longer run, the rises present opportunities to export for Western African farmers with a high potential for rice production to replace imports with domestic production.

During 2015–2020, global food prices were more stable and relatively low, after a sizable increase in late 2017, they are back under 75% of the nominal value seen during the all-time high in the 2011 food crisis. In the long term, prices are expected to stabilize. Farmers will grow more grain for both fuel and food and eventually bring prices down. This has already occurred with wheat, with more crops planted in the United States, Canada, and Europe in 2009. However, the Food and Agriculture Organization projects that consumers still have to deal with more expensive food until at least 2018.

In 2021, global food prices rose significantly in larger part due to supply chain disruptions during the COVID pandemic , and in 2022, the FAO reported that the world Food Price Index reached an all-time high in February, posting a 24% year-over-year increase. Most of the data for the February report was compiled before the 2022 Russian invasion of Ukraine, but analysts said a prolonged conflict could have a major effect on grain exports catalyzing a further food crises.

In March 2024, Nigeria's food inflation rate reached 40.01% year-on-year, driven by currency depreciation, supply chain disruptions, and rising agricultural input costs. Essential food items like garri, millet, and yam tubers saw significant price hikes. This inflation exacerbates food insecurity and reduces household purchasing power.

== See also ==
- Global Hunger Index
- Recent food crises:
  - 2007–08 world food price crisis
  - 2010–12 world food price crisis
  - 2022–2023 food crises
- Food riot
- Agricultural marketing
- Fast food, Junk food
- Commodity risk
- Subsistence crisis
- Food inflation

== Sources ==
This article incorporates text from a free content work. Licensed under CC BY 4.0 (license statement/permission). Text taken from The State of Agricultural Commodity Markets 2026, Food and Agriculture Organization of the United Nations.

This article incorporates text from a free content work. Licensed under CC BY-SA 3.0 (license statement/permission). Text taken from The State of Food and Agriculture 2019. Moving forward on food loss and waste reduction, In brief, 24, FAO, FAO.

This article incorporates text from a free content work. Licensed under CC BY 4.0 (license statement/permission). Text taken from The State of Food Security and Nutrition in the World 2025, Food and Agriculture Organization of the United Nations.

== Literature ==
- Eric Holt-Gimenez; Raj Patel, eds. (2009). Food Rebellions: Crisis and the Hunger for Justice. Food First Books. ISBN 978-0935028348.
- Schlosser, Eric (2002). Fast Food Nation: What The All-American Meal is Doing to the World. Penguin Books Limited. ISBN 978-0141006871.
