= British Currency School =

British currency school economists

The British Currency School was a group of British economists, active in the 1840s and 1850s, who argued that the excessive issuing of banknotes was a major cause of price inflation. They believed that, in order to restrict circulation, issuers of new banknotes should be required to hold an equivalent value of gold as a reserve. This concept was also known as convertibility and the currency principle. They argued that prices were mostly based on quantity of currency in circulation, but did acknowledge that prices were also affected by deposits. Therefore, by controlling prices banks could limit outflow of gold.

== Bullionism controversy ==
The Currency School emerged from the beliefs of the Bullionist group, which was prevalent in the early 1800s. When the French landed on English soil in 1797, financial panic arose in Britain. Due to the 18th century banking system, there was high concern of banking panic, a financial crisis that occurs when many bank runs occur at the same time and people rush to withdraw paper money or transfer money to other assets. The British government intervened by allowing banks to suspend convertibility of the notes issued by the Bank of England. The Bullionist group, composed of mostly bankers and lawyers, formed after this potential crisis. They argued for convertibility, meaning paper money should be 100% backed by gold, in order to avoid inevitable inflation. Henry Thorton and David Ricardo were two of the main figures which helped propel the Bullionist group. Ricardo published "The Price of Gold", and "The High Price of Bullion; a Proof of the Depreciation of Bank Notes", which made him well known as an economist. He, in turn, helped develop the Labor theory of Value which states "any commodity's natural value is determined by cost of production". Thorton was known for his opposition to the real bills doctrine.

Nevertheless, lines of continuity between the earlier and later controversies should not be exaggerated: some bullionists would later oppose the currency school, while one of its leading theorists - Robert Torrens - had earlier been an anti-bullionist.

== Evolution ==
Following the Napoleonic War, the Bank Charter Act 1844 was passed. This act allowed only the Bank of England to print money and required all banks to hold a specific amount of reserve and currency. However, crucially, the Bank of England was only allowed to print new banknotes to the extent that they were backed by additional gold reserves. This act was passed under the Conservative government of Robert Peel. The leading figure of the school was Samuel Jones-Loyd, Baron Overstone, the British politician and banker. More than fifty years later his role in the debate was analyzed and criticized by Henry Meulen, an opponent of the act.

== Repercussions ==
The Currency School was opposed by members of the British Banking School, who argued that currency issue could be naturally restricted by the desire of bank depositors to redeem their notes for gold and that Currency-School policy would result in financial crises. In the years following the Bank Charter Act 1844, the act was suspended three times following serious financial crises, favouring the Banking School argument, but nonetheless the Currency School policy prevailed but convertibility was mostly maintained in the last quarter of the nineteenth century by the use of Banking-School interest-rate policy by the Bank of England.
