= Two Dishes One Soup Index =

Hong Kong food price measure

2 dishes and 1 soup index is a reference index figure which measures and monitor the changes of general and regional food price in Hong Kong. It is established by the Social Affairs Committee of The Hong Kong Federation of Trade Unions (HKFTU) since January 2011. The index is based on the monthly market random sampling done by the HKFTU and is published seasonally on 'FTU Press'. Suggestions to government will be proposed by the Committee.

== Aims ==
The index aims to help households to handle price inflation.

== Measurement ==
The index is based on a diet of family size of 3–4 members, selects 7 typical and usual food ingredients as references to prepare two dishes and one soup, to see the cost needed. The seven ingredients includes:

1 catty of Choi Sum
½ catty of beef
2 tael of Meigan Cai
1 catty of Grass carp
½ catty of Tomato
½ catty of Potato
½ catty of meat
(1 catty= 16 tael = 605 g approx.)

== Data ==
=== Data of 2011 ===
The average price for buying 7 ingredients to prepare 2 dishes and 1 soup rose from HK$78.4 in January to HK$89 in December, increased by 13.7%. 14 out of 18 districts of Hong Kong have recorded an increase in food price.

- Most Expensive Market

Southern (Aberdeen Market) HK$93.5
Wan Chai (Wan Chai Market) HK$92
Central and Western (Smithfield Market) HK$92

- Cheapest Market

Sham Shui Po (Pek Ho Street Market) HK$84
Wong Tai Sin (Ngau Chi Wan Market) HK$84
Yuen Long (Tong Yik Market) HK$85.5

=== Data of 2012 ===
The average price of ingredients increased from HK$89 to HK$104.4 (+17%).

- Most Expensive Market

Southern (Aberdeen Market) HK$119.2
Tseung Kwan O (Hau Tak Market) HK$109.7(+40.6%)

=== Data of 2013 ===
The committee found that the prices of main food increased from to HK$109.3, by 14.2% compare to last year's index, higher than inflation. Among these, prices of beef and potato increased by 29% and 25.2% respectively. The districts with the highest increase are districts of low-income families, especially Sham Shui Po and Tuen Mun.

- Most Expensive Market

Tsing Yi HK$120.45
Tuen Mun HK$104.5(+35.6%)

- Cheapest Market

Tsuen Wan HK$95.8(+10.4%)

=== Data of 2014 ===
The first seasonal Two-dishes-one-soup Index in 2014 showed a rise of price of the ingredient among the eighteen districts in Hong Kong. The Index was $105.01 in the first season of 2013 and $112.63 in 2014, meaning that the price of ingredient has raised 7.27% when compared to the data of the same season in 2013.

The Two-dishes-one-soup Index of the second season of 2014 reflect a slight relief of inflation as 9 districts out of 18 recorded a decrease in the price of ingredient, but 4 districts remained a 10% increase of food price. Meanwhile, Tung Chung Yat Tung Estate Market was found to be the most expensive one among the 18 districts, the food price of it has raised 14.12% from $109.1 to $124.5

Two dishes one soup index 2014 (2nd season) HK$106.5

- Most Expensive Market

Lantau (Tung Chung) HK$124.5(+14.12%)
Tsuen Wan (Yeung Uk Road)
Sha Tin (Central Street)

In the third season of 2014, the average food price of the 18 districts decreased. The average food price of Ngau Chi Wan Market in Wong Tai Sin decreased sharply from $115.38 to $98.25, which means decreased 14.85%. Also, the Two-dishes-one-soup Index decreased 6.33% from $111.28 in the same season in 2013 to $104.24, this reflected a relief of inflation of food price in Hong Kong.

Two dishes one soup index 2014 (3rd season) HK$104.24

- Most Expensive Market

Sha Tin (Central Street) HK$116.75
Wong Tai Sin (Ngau Chi Wan) HK$98.25(−14.85%)

== Suggestions ==
- Develop local primary industry to stabilise food supply;
- Open local live cattle market and introduce market competition to stabilise meat price;
- Introduce small enterprise in wet market to stop monopoly of supermarket;
- Examine minimum wage every year to narrow down wealth gap
- Diversify the economy when develop new towns
- Build more FEHD markets, cooked food centre, flea market and night market to relief citizens' burden in food purchasing
- Co-operate with China to stabilise food supply
- Introduce welfare policies such as Tax allowance, Electricity fee subsidy, etc.
