= Jollof index =

The Jollof Index is a metric developed by Nigerian research firm SBM Intelligence to measure food inflation by tracking the cost of ingredients used to prepare Jollof rice, a popular West African dish. The index, launched in 2015, compiles monthly data from markets across Nigeria and Ghana, offering valuable insights into food inflation and its effects on households and the broader economy. Food typically accounts for about two-thirds of household spending in Nigeria, making the Jollof Index a key tool for assessing changes in a major expense category.

Methodology

The index monitors the prices of essential Jollof rice ingredients such as rice, tomatoes, onions, pepper, protein (chicken, beef, or turkey), seasoning, and vegetable oil. Data is collected from multiple markets to capture regional variations and trends, and findings are published monthly. The methodology allows for longitudinal analysis, revealing both national and regional shifts in food affordability.

The index was first published in 2015. It focuses on West Africa, particularly Nigeria and Ghana, and can be used to track differences between different areas of the country, e.g., if the price goes up in Lagos but down in a different area.

The Jollof Index is updated monthly, allowing for timely tracking of changes in food prices and their impact on the economy. It provides longitudinal information, e.g., showing that the price of one pot of Jollof increased by 60% between October 2016 and October 2019.

By the end of 2024, rice prices in Nigeria skyrocketed to record highs, with a 50-kilogram bag costing around 75,000 naira ($48.5 at the prevailing exchange rate) in Lagos and 99,000 naira in Abuja. This surge in prices led to widespread hunger, with two out of three Nigerian households struggling to afford food.

Recent Developments (2024–2025)

Dramatic Increases in Food Costs

Beginning in late 2023 and accelerating into 2025, the Jollof Index reported an unprecedented surge in food prices across Nigeria, far outpacing general Consumer Price Index (CPI) inflation. By June 2025, the average cost of preparing a single pot of Jollof rice reached ₦27,528—a 153% increase compared to March 2023. In some parts of the country, like Abuja, costs soared from around ₦4,100 in 2016 to over ₦32,000 by June 2025, with much of the escalation occurring after 2021. For context, this means a single pot of Jollof now accounts for approximately 40% of Nigeria's new minimum monthly wage.

Ingredient Price Drivers

The rapid escalation is driven by several factors:

- Currency devaluation and exchange rate volatility, which have increased the cost of imported food and ingredients;
- High transportation and energy costs, partly linked to the removal of Nigeria's fuel subsidy in 2023;
- Persistent supply chain disruptions due to insecurity in farming regions (such as banditry, conflict, and farmer displacement);
- Sharp increases in prices for protein (turkey, chicken, beef), vegetables, and especially rice — the price of a 50kg bag of rice in Lagos rose to ₦75,000 by late 2024, while Abuja saw prices up to ₦99,000;
- Regional disparities, with areas like Bauchi and Port Harcourt experiencing the steepest increases due to local insecurity and disrupted food supply chains.

Social and Economic Impact

The record-high food prices have resulted in widespread hardship. By mid-2025, it was estimated that two out of three Nigerian households struggled to afford sufficient food, and up to 13 million Nigerians could be pushed into poverty. Many families have been forced to reduce meal portions, switch to less nutritious alternatives, or skip meals altogether. Food processors, retailers, and logistics providers are also facing increased costs and declining consumer demand.

Comparison with Ghana

The Jollof Index also tracks food prices in Ghana, where the cost of preparing Jollof rice, though consistently higher than in Nigeria, has been somewhat more stable thanks to currency appreciation and regular macroeconomic policies. In June 2025, the average cost of preparing Jollof rice in Ghana stood at GH₵420. However, Ghana's inflation, while significant, has shown signs of easing compared to Nigeria's persistent surge.

== See also ==
- Big Mac Index
- KFC Index
- Price index
- Inflation
