= Shoe leather cost =

Opportunity cost of avoiding holding cash on hand

Metaphorically, shoe leather cost is the cost of time and effort (or opportunity costs of time and effort) that people expend by holding less cash in order to reduce the inflation tax that they pay on cash holdings when there is high inflation. These costs include, having to make additional trips to the bank, not being able to make change, or not being able to make unexpected purchases. The term comes from the fact that more walking is required (historically, although the rise of the Internet has reduced it) to go to the bank and get cash and spend it, thus wearing out shoes more quickly. A significant cost of reducing money holdings is the additional time and convenience that must be sacrificed to keep less money on hand than would be required if there were less or no inflation.

== Theory ==
Increased shoe-leather cost is one of the impacts of inflation. In a period of high inflation, people are discouraged from holding large amounts of cash because its value deteriorates quickly relative to the rising prices in the economy. People tend to hold most of their money in a non-transactions bank account and keep only very small amounts of cash with them. This causes them to make regular trips to their bank to withdraw cash to pay for goods and services. These regular trips wear out their shoe-leather, thus creating a 'shoe-leather cost'.

The term “shoe-leather cost” is now used more generally to describe all the costs associated with having to hold small amounts of cash when there is high inflation.

== See also ==
- Menu cost
