= Menu cost =

Cost of changing prices

In economics, a menu cost is the cost incurred by a firm when changing its prices. The concept is one microeconomic explanation for the stickiness of prices in the macroeconomy, particularly emphasized by New Keynesian economists.

The term originated from the literal cost faced by restaurants when printing new menus to update prices. However, its meaning has been generalized to encompass a wide range of costs associated with price adjustments. These include:

- the administrative costs of planning and deciding on new prices,
- the costs of informing consumers about price changes, and
- the potential loss in demand if consumers are reluctant to purchase at the new price.

Examples of menu costs include updating computer systems, re-tagging items, changing signage, printing new menus, correcting mistakes after price changes, and hiring consultants to develop new pricing strategies.

Firms can reduce menu costs by adopting more flexible pricing practices, such as digital price displays or dynamic pricing strategies, which minimize the frequency and expense of physical price changes.

== Menu costs and nominal rigidity ==
Menu costs are the costs incurred by the business when it changes the prices it offers customers. A typical example is a restaurant that has to reprint the new menu when it needs to change the prices of its in-store goods. So, menu costs are one factor that can contribute to nominal rigidity. Firms are faced with the decision to alter prices frequently as a result of changes in the general price level, product costs, market structure, regulation and demand level. Despite frequent market changes, businesses may be hesitant to update prices to reflect these changes due to menu costs. If the menu cost outweighs the expected increase in revenue associated with the price change firms would prefer to exist in disequilibrium and stay at the original price level. When the nominal price level remains constant despite market change is said that there is nominal rigidity or price stickiness in the market. For example, a restaurant should not change its prices until the price change generates enough additional revenue to cover the cost of printing a new menu. Thus, menu costs can create considerable nominal rigidity in other industries or markets, essentially amplifying their impact on the entire industry through a chain reaction of suppliers and distributors.

== History ==
The concept of the menu cost has originally introduced by Eytan Sheshinski and Yoram Weiss (1977) in their paper looking at the effect of inflation on the frequency of price changes. Sheshink and Weiss concluded that even fully anticipated inflation results in an actual menu cost for the business. They suggested that businesses will change prices in discrete jumps rather than continual changes when in an inflationary environment. This justifies the fixed costs of changing prices when revenues are expected to increase.

The idea of applying menu costs as an aspect of Nominal Price Rigidity was simultaneously put forward by several New Keynesian economists in 1985–1986. In 1985, Gregory Mankiw concluded that even small menu costs create inefficient price adjustment and push equilibrium below the point which is socially optimal. He further suggested that the subsequent loss of welfare far exceeds the menu cost that causes it. Michael Parkin also put forward the idea. George Akerlof and Janet Yellen put forward the idea that due to bounded rationality firms will not want to change their price unless the benefit is more than a small amount. This bounded rationality leads to inertia in nominal prices and wages which can lead to output fluctuating at constant nominal prices and wages. The menu cost idea was also extended to wages as well as prices by Olivier Blanchard and Nobuhiro Kiyotaki.

The new Keynesian explanation of price stickiness relied on introducing imperfect competition with price (and wage) setting agents. This started a shift in macroeconomics away from using the model of perfect competition with price taking agents to use imperfectly competitive equilibria with price and wage setting agents (mostly adopting monopolistic competition). Huw Dixon and Claus Hansen showed that even if menu costs were applied to a small sector of the economy, this would influence the rest of the economy and lead to prices in the rest of the economy becoming less responsive to changes in demand.

In 2007, Mikhail Golosov and Robert Lucas found that the size of the menu cost needed to match the micro-data of price adjustment inside an otherwise standard business cycle model is implausibly large to justify the menu-cost argument. The reason is that such models lack "real rigidity". This is a property that markups do not get squeezed by large adjustment in factor prices (such as wages) that could occur in response to the monetary shock. Modern New Keynesian models address this issue by assuming that the labor market is segmented, so that the expansion in employment by a given firm does not lead to lower profits for the other firms.

== Magnitude of menu costs ==
When a company's menu costs a lot in economic markets, the price adjustment is usually major. The company would not engage in price adjustment if profit margins start to fall to the point where menu costs lead to more revenue losses.

The type of company and the technology used determine factors that change prices and costs. For example, it may be necessary to reprint the latest menu, contact the distributor, to change the price list and the prices of items on the shelf. Menu costs in some industries may be small, but the scale may influence business decisions about whether to reprice.

A 1997 study published by Harvard College and MIT used data from 5 multistore supermarket chains to investigate the magnitude of menu costs. They considered the cost of:

1. Labour to change shelf prices
2. Printing and delivering new labels
3. Mistakes during the changeover process
4. Supervision during the changeover process

Results of the study showed that the menu cost was on average $105,887 per year, per store. This figure comprised 0.7% of revenue, 32.5% of net margins and $0.52/price change. Subsequently in order for updating prices to be beneficial the profitability of an item needed to decrease by more than 32.5%. The study concluded that menu costs have a magnitude large enough to be of macroeconomic significance.

== Factors influencing menu costs ==
Pricing regulation

Pricing and regulatory requirements such as requiring individual price stickers on each item can increase menu costs by increasing the time needed to update prices in stores physically. The study summarised above, which detailed the magnitude of menu costs in multistore supermarkets, also investigated the impact of pricing laws that required individual price tags to be placed on items. The study found that menu costs were 2.5 times higher for the store impacted by the local pricing requirements. Further, firms not subject to the requirements were found to change the prices of 15.6% of products every week compared to 6.3% of products in the chain subject to the laws.

Number of product variants

A 2015 study published by the MIT Press, used data from a national retailer operating a large number of stores selling groceries, health and beauty products to investigate the impact of that the number of product variants has on the frequency of price change. The study concluded that cost increases led to price increases on 71.2% of occasions for products with a single variant compared to 59.8% of the time where there were seven or more variants. This result was linked with the increased price stickiness associated with the additional cost of labour required to change the price of multiple items.

Industry/market

A shift to e-commerce has seen a decrease in menu costs. A study on the price setting of Amazon Fresh (an online grocery store) found that product prices of the online retailer are less rigid than the prices of traditional brick and mortar grocery stores. The study found that on average a product listed on Amazon Fresh had 20.4 price changes in a year and the median magnitude of these changes was 10%. The study suggests that decreased pricing rigidity could be attributable to automated pricing algorithms allowing businesses to respond in real time to market shocks.

== Menu costs and inflation ==
We may intuitively think that the relationship between menu cost and inflation rate may be very simple. A key prediction of any menu cost model is that the fraction of firms that re-price in a given time interval will increase with increases in the inflation rate. And for deflation, even large disinflations have small real effects if credibly carried out. So, the higher the inflation rate, the lower the menu cost. The two may be a clear positive correlation.

But the actual situation may not be the case.

Mikhail Golosov et al. found in a 2007 study that the real cause of menu cost changes (i.e. menu price adjustments) comes from idiosyncratic shocks – kind of unexpected shocks. When the idiosyncratic shocks in the model are shut down, the frequency of price adjustments is roughly unchanged in high inflationary environments but it is much reduced when inflation is low. That is to say, in the context of stable high inflation, sellers will not frequently adjust menu prices.

Mikhail Golosov et al. also explained the way in which idiosyncratic shocks work. Although idiosyncratic shocks may seem like a sudden change in price, their most important role is shocking to productivity or demand. That is to say, it is not simply a sudden increase in the amount of currency - therefore, the role of currency in influencing menu costs is neutral.

On the other hand, even though idiosyncratic shocks cause most of the price adjustments, new prices reflect both firm-level and aggregate shocks. Thus even a small inflationary shock, one which is not sufficient to lead to a price change on its own, is quickly reflected in new prices as firms react to other shocks.

To summarize, the essence of menu costs is the result of actual factors affecting the enterprise, rather than monetary factors. This is also why when discussing "Factors influencing menu costs" in the previous section of this article, only actual factors such as Pricing regulation, Number of product variables, and Industry/market are mentioned.

== Analysing menu cost ==
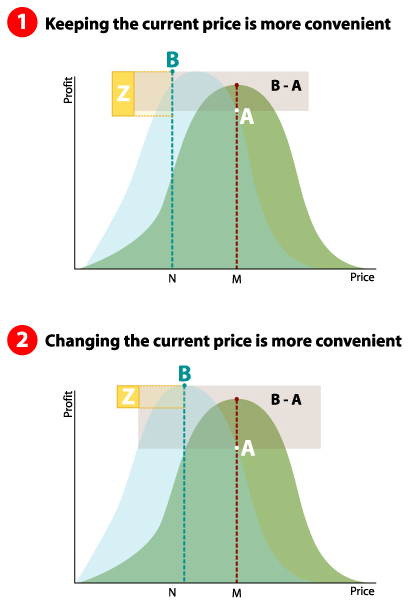
Menu cost graph

When to use menu cost

Consider a firm in a hypothetical economy, with a normally distributed graph describing the relationship between the price of its goods and the firm's corresponding profit. The firm seeks to maximise profit at the corresponding price value M.

Now suppose a shock to the market shifts the profit curve to a new theoretical model. The firm must decide whether to maintain price M with a suboptimal profit level A, or adjust the price to N, which corresponds to the new maximised profit level B. Let menu cost (the cost of adjusting prices) equal Z.

If Z < B − A, then the menu cost is less than the theoretical increase in profits and adjusting prices to N is economically profitable.

Daily fluctuations in the economy lead to small shifts in firm structure, supply and demand affecting the profits curve. However, firms do not in turn adjust their prices constantly as Z acts as a buffer, making such small benefits economically unviable compared to the menu cost.

Note that as Z approaches 0, prices will constantly adjust to match the optimal profit level from the shifting economy as there is no cost to do so.

Finding menu cost

Menu cost encompasses the cost of informing consumers in the form of advertising and labour involved in repricing/ repackaging, as well as information cost for accurate profit curves and quantity demanded.

Z(q_{i}, r_{j}, s_{k}) = A(q_{1, . . .,}q_{i}) + L(r_{1, . . .,}r_{j}) + N(s_{1}, . . ., s_{k})

where A, L, and N are advertising, labour and information respectively and i, j, k are integers equal to the number of variables required for each function (e.g. L(r_{1,}r_{2}) is the production function labour cost of repackaging using wage per hour and quantity of boxes as two variables, therefore, j = 2). Each firm will have a different set of A, L and N functions depending on their market and firm structure. It can be reported by examining the menu prices of the restaurants in detail.

== See also ==
- New Keynesian economics
- Bounded rationality
- Sticky (economics)
- Shoe leather cost
- Inflation
