= Stealth inflation =

Stealth inflation is a term with different meanings. It denotes an increase in prices that is obfuscated in one way or another.

== Measurement issues ==
At the level of the economy, the term stealth inflation is used to denounce issues with how inflation is measured or which type of inflation is measured.

D.L Losman suggested that the measurement of the consumer price index in the United States may be subject to manipulation in order to lower the adjustment rate of social security benefits. Focussing on which inflation is measured, Peng argues that the focus on core inflation hides commodity-based inflation from the attention of policymakers.

== Hidden price increases ==
At the level of the consumer, the term stealth inflation usually refers to hidden charges or fees. Examples are overdraft fees from banks, surcharges from telecommunication providers, processing fees and installation fees.
