= Food inflation =

Type of inflation

Inflation map showing food consumer prices (2024 average)

Food inflation is a type of inflation that affects food items. It is often the most noticeable form of inflation, and tends to impact lower income individuals the hardest. Common causes include poor harvest, war, increasing energy prices, and food being unharvested. Food inflation almost always leads to currency inflation, as food is a requirement for survival.

Inflation in food consumer prices by region

The most common policy to counter-measure to food inflation is subsidies and price controls. During times of crisis, such as war or famine governments often implement a system of food rationing. Food stamps, or a food aid to lower income individuals also helps alleviate food inflation. Maintaining a varied agricultural industry can help mitigate the effects of food inflation on a single crop. In the case of artificial food inflation laws or litigation can be used against corporations that practice predatory pricing, monopoly pricing or price gouging. Lower income individuals have lower savings and tend to spend more of their income on basic necessities, resulting in food inflation disproportionally effecting those who are lower income.

== Overview ==
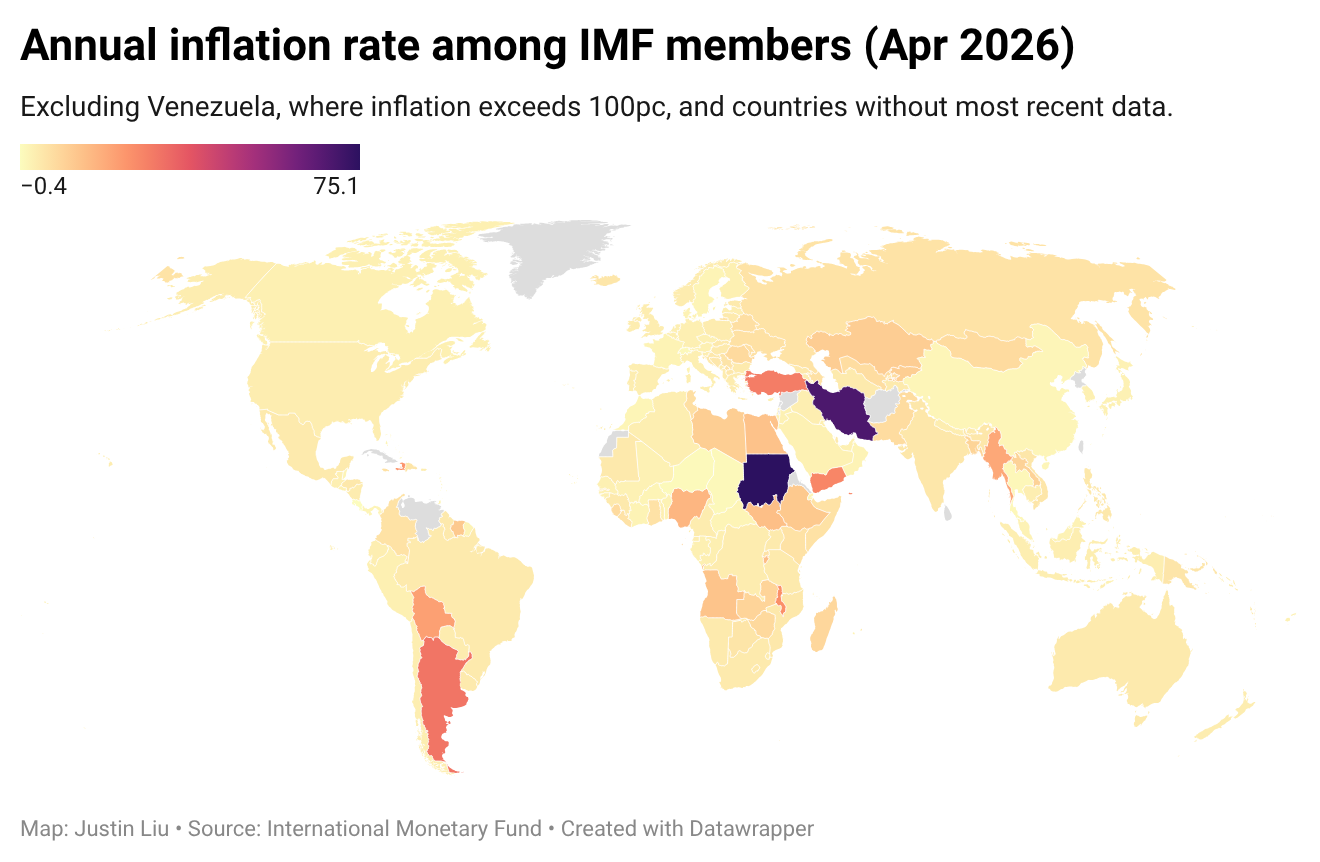
Inflation across IMF countries in 2026

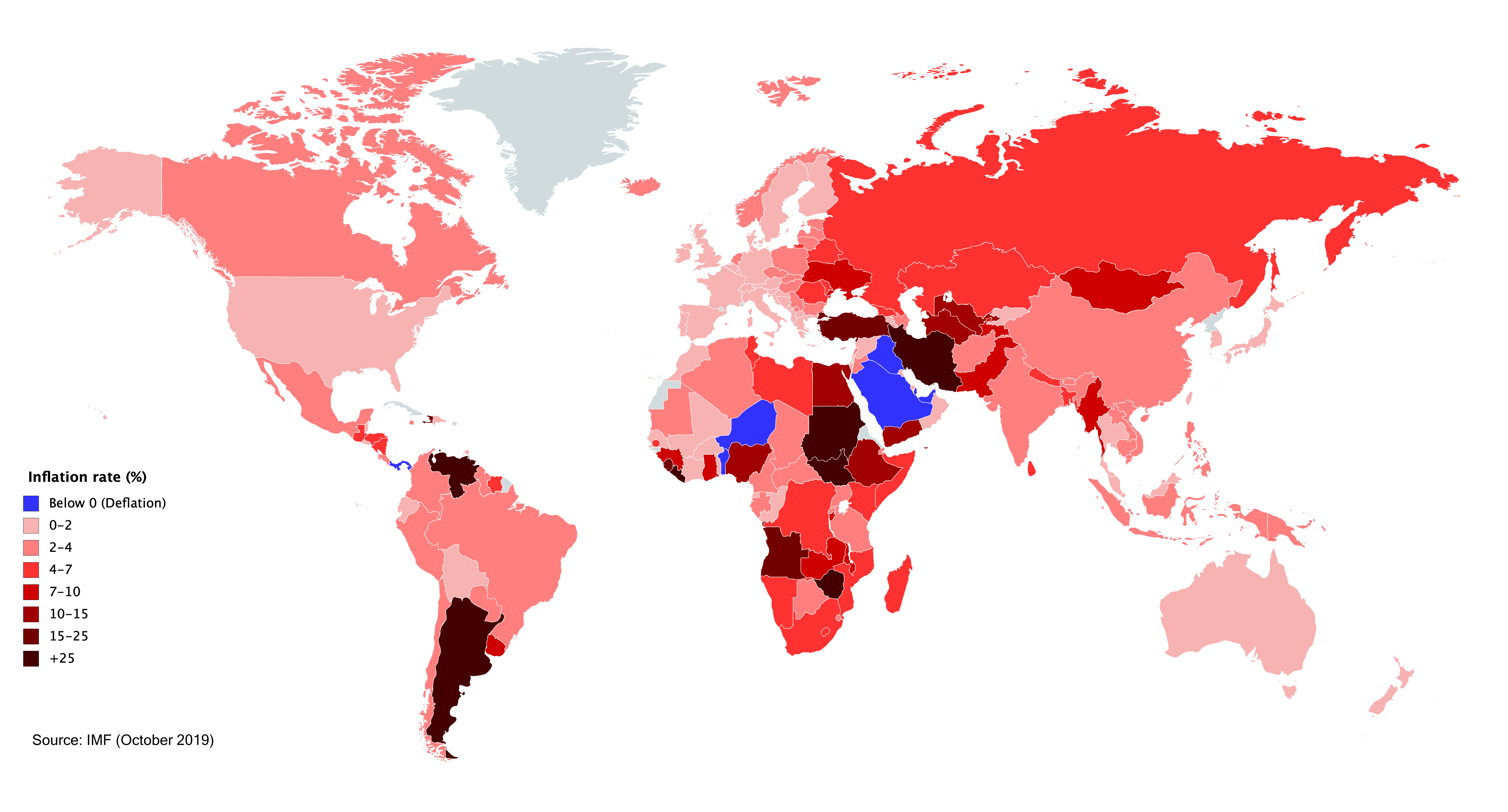
Inflation across the world in 2019 by the World Economic Outlook in 2024

Food price inflation was the highest in low-income countries between 2019–2024.

Food inflation encompasses, and expands beyond into agricultural inflation, and usually affects specific foods more so than others. Particular foods that are hit by food inflation are luxury foods such as truffles. Certain foods are susceptible to price changes due to climate change such coffee and chocolate. Luxury foods are usually unable to be harvested in times of instability, and demand for such products tend to decrease. During World War II the British ended most luxury food production to focus on low cost staple food production. Seasonal foods are particularly affected by price changes, as the supply of the food fluctuates.

Although luxury or niche foods are the most susceptible to food inflation, they tend to have minor effects on the population. Food inflation on staple foods, such as wheat, rice or corn are rarer, but its effects tend to be devastating. Generally most countries try to avoid food inflation on staple foods at all cost, such as by subsiding bread. Areas that have high food inflation on staple foods tend to be in periods of high instability, or have an incredibly poor harvest.

Food inflation on staple foods can occur from disease, especially when the biodiversity of the crop is low. As with low genetic diversity, one disease can wipe out entire fields. Generally staple foods are plants, as meats usually are fed using edible plants, and are typically more expensive. Exceptions including fishing and herding in regions where the plants are inedible to humans, such as in Mongolia (sheep), the Sioux (bison), and the Sami people, (reindeer). In developed nations, meat may also be a staple food owing to greater wealth.

== Causes ==
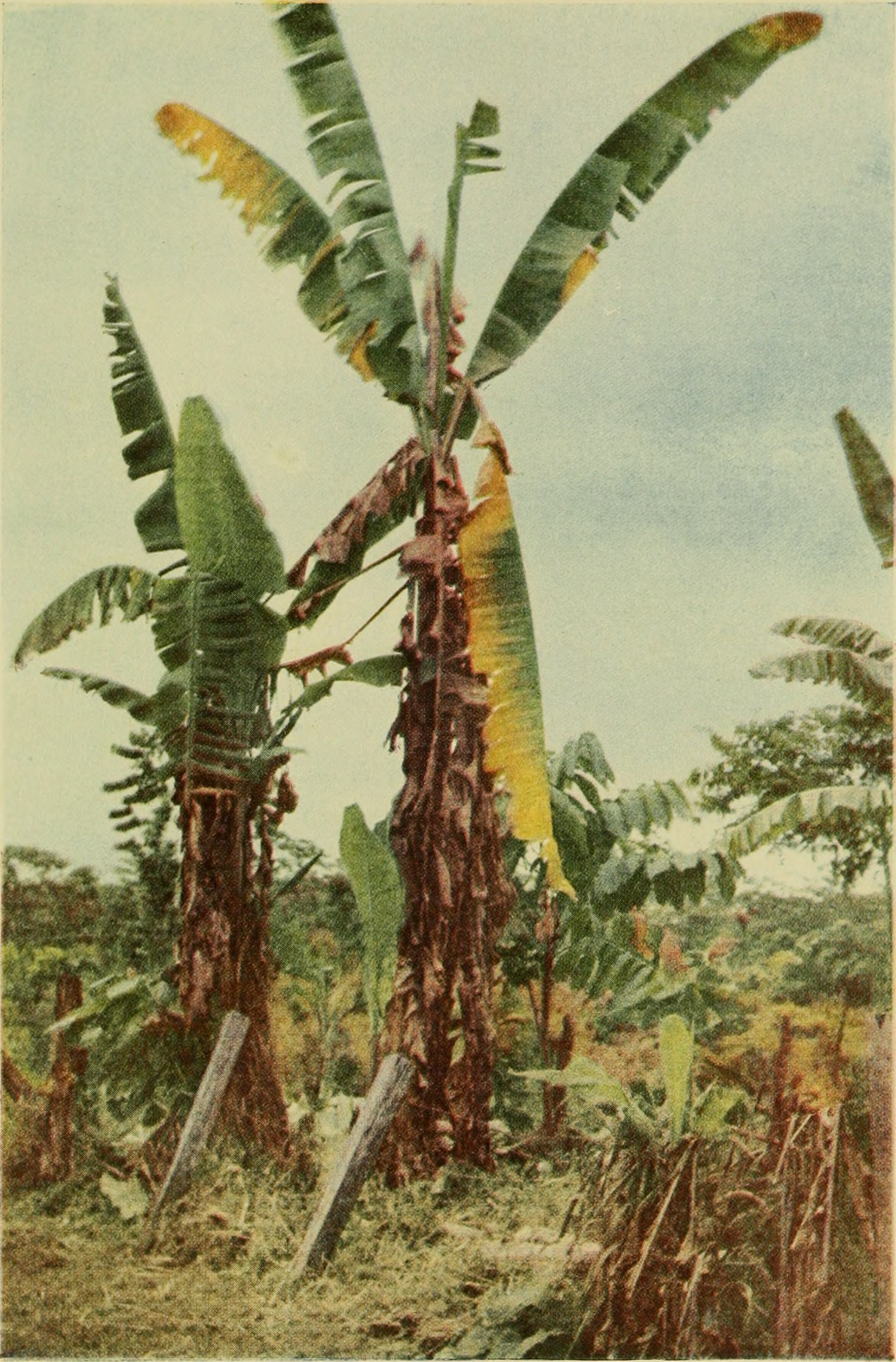
Gros Michel banana the previous standard variety of banana was devastated by Panama disease due to monocultural practices, leading to the Cavendish becoming standard

Causes include climate change, instability, poor harvest, and high energy cost. It can be induced by crop disease such as the great Irish famine which was caused by a monoculture of planting a single species of potato, the Irish Lumper. When Phytophthora infestans (potato blight) spread to Ireland, the low genetic diversity of the crop resulted in the majority of the crop dying, resulting in exponentially high food inflation, the subsequent inaction and exploitation by British officials caused a famine. Other times food inflation can be caused by intentional price gouging in which usually large corporations control an artificially high price for the cost of food, often this is done first through predatory pricing in which the cost of food items are set below market value at which point competition is driven out and artificially high prices become standard.

Food inflation is also often caused by war in which trade slows and food often becomes scarce. During times or war or instability, rationing systems are often used to avoid food inflation, speculation or food hoarding which is usually overseen by the military. Food inflation caused by military endeavors can often lead to famine, such the Bengal famine in which massive amounts of rice and grain was taken away from the population of Bengal to feed British civilians and soldiers, as such the Bengal famine is often classified as a man made famine.

One of the main determining factor of the price of food is energy cost, harvesting machines (such as combine harvesters) require large amounts of energy to maintain high crop yields. As well as this crop tending requires high amounts of energy, such as watering, fertilizing, and weeding, thereby increases to the cost of energy directly affects food prices. The 1970s energy crisis saw a major spike in food inflation as food production became more expensive. Another cause is perpetual monoculture practices, which can degrade soil leading to lower yields and thereby requiring exponentially higher levels of fertilizer, particularly nitrogen.

== Effects ==
Those most affected by food inflation tend to be lower income individuals, who spend more money on basic necessities. As food prices increase, most purchases by the lower class stop to maintain basic needs, which in turn leads to economic slowdown. Generally high income individuals are not as affected by food inflation, as these individuals tend to have large savings, can afford basic foods, and spend less of their income on food. Food affordability is associated with increased stress, and impacting a person's quality of life.

== Prevention and counter measures ==
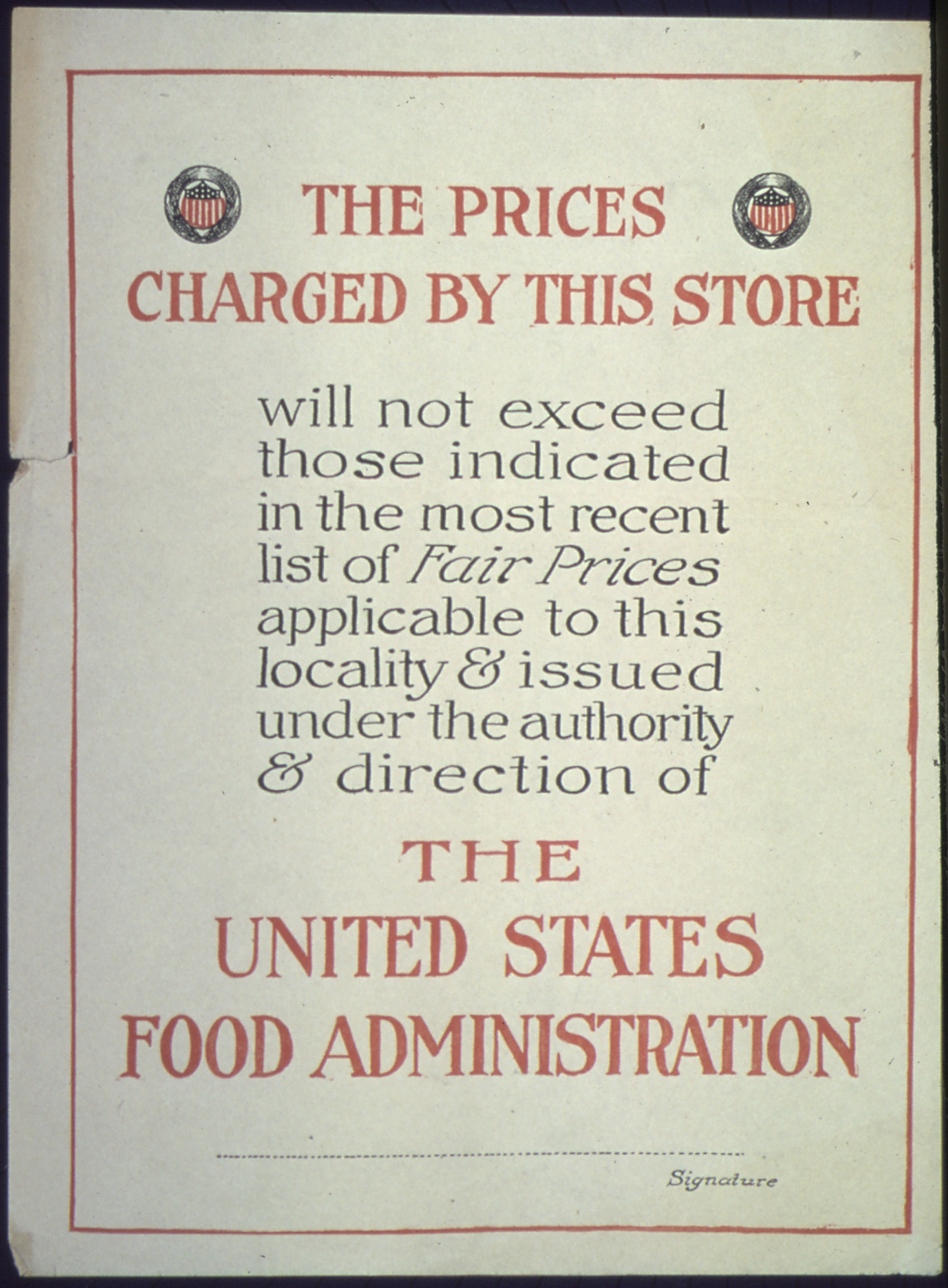
World War I poster of the United States Food Administration on price controls

The main way to prevent food inflation is by maintaining a healthy agricultural sector, and maintaining trade. Price controls are often used to maintain affordable prices, although this can backfire if the price of harvesting the food begins to outweigh the price of the food. Food banks are usually used to stockpile large amounts of usually non-perishable food which can then be distributed to those in need. Maintaining sustainable agricultural practices that do not overrely on monoculture or a single genetic variant of a crop can protect against food inflation. In the case of price gouging, consumer protections can be enforced to counteract inflation by litigation for unfair practices, or by banning predatory pricing. Parts of Europe such as Germany have banned exploitative trading practices.

Food is considered by almost all countries on earth to be a human right, and giving food aid, or subsidized food lower income individuals helps mitigate one of the main groups affected by food inflation. During times of international crisis, food inflation can result in famine, under these circumstance many poor countries rely on humanitarian aid.

== History ==
Food price inflation rose since late 2020, peaking in January 2023.

Food inflation has been documented for nearly all of human agricultural history. Early attempts to curb Ancient inflation included the Edict on Maximum Prices by Diocletian which attempted to maintain a price control for food, which had risen dramatically during the crisis of the third century.

One of the main instigators of the French Revolution was high food inflation with a poor harvest the year prior, the women's march on Versailles was caused by the increasing price of bread, and is often seen as one of the major moments in the French Revolution. The Russian Revolution, and Syrian civil war were both predated by high food inflation.

As wars progress, food scarcity generally increases, and if a population is not fed it can result in political unrest. This occurred with the Russian revolution and the southern bread riots where a lack proper food distribution resulted in an uprising.

During the COVID-19 pandemic food prices rose dramatically. In the United States average food prices rose 25% from 2019 to 2023. Food demand also rose dramatically, across the world over the same period. The price of eggs in the United States grew dramatically in 2024 and 2025, due to outbreaks of bird flu.

== See also ==
- Right to food
- Food insecurity
- Food politics
- Food system
- Food riot
- Food safety
