= British Banking School =

The British Banking School was a group of 19th century economists from the United Kingdom who wrote on monetary and banking issues. The school arose in opposition to the British Currency School; they argued that currency issue could be naturally restricted by the desire of bank depositors to redeem their notes for gold. According to Jacob Viner the main members of the Banking School were Thomas Tooke, John Fullarton, James Wilson and J. W. Gilbart. They believed:

"The amount of paper notes in circulation was adequately controlled by the ordinary processes of competitive banking, and if the requirement of convertibility was maintained, could not exceed the needs of business for any appreciable length of time".

Thus they opposed the requirement in the Bank Charter Act 1844 for a reserve requirement on banknotes.

== Creation of Banking School versus Currency School ==
During the early and mid 19th century Britain had been plagued economically due to the conversion of currency from gold to a paper currency. This switch to inconvertible currency spiraled Britain's economy into a financial crisis. Throughout this period of time two financial groups were formed, these groups were known as the British Banking School and the British Currency School.

"The goal of both camps was to discover the optimal method of limiting (or not limiting) banking practices so as to encourage economic stability."

== Economic beliefs ==
The British Banking school opposed the views carried by the British Currency School on notes and deposits. There were two main arguments presented by the British Banking School. One being, that both notes and deposits perform the same economic function. Secondly, they argued that no restrictions should be placed on either notes or deposits except for the convertibility to coin form. They believe no restrictions should be made because, "money is seen as a means of exchange which is spontaneously—or market-endogenously, as it is called—created among traders." The banking position was summed up perfectly by Viner when he stated, "The amount of paper notes in circulation [is] adequately controlled by the ordinary processes of competitive banking, and if the requirement of convertibility was maintained, could not exceed the needs of business for any appreciable length of time" (Viner 1937, p. 223). Meaning, the demand of credit in business relies heavily on banking policy and their interest rates. The Banking-School theory of crises provided an answer as to why the first three quarters of the nineteenth century were plagued by serious financial crises (see financial crises sub-section Banking School theory of crises) approximately every ten years.

== Peel's Act reaction ==
The Bank Charter Act 1844, also known as Peel's Act, was initially a loss for the British Banking School because it split the bank into two branches, a branch for the notes and a branch for the deposits. "The act imposed what was essentially a 100-percent reserve requirement onto the note-issuing department." However, in 1847 severe economic panics resulted from the Bank Charter Act 1844, causing the 100 percent reserve requirement to be suspended to keep the banks afloat. Nonetheless, this crisis in 1847 validated many of the Banking School's beliefs such as money should not be restricted but naturally run. The Banking Charter Act 1844 resulted in multiple victories. As McCaffrey states, "Although the Currency School enjoyed the de jure success, de facto victory went to the Banking School."
