= 2010–2012 world food price crisis =

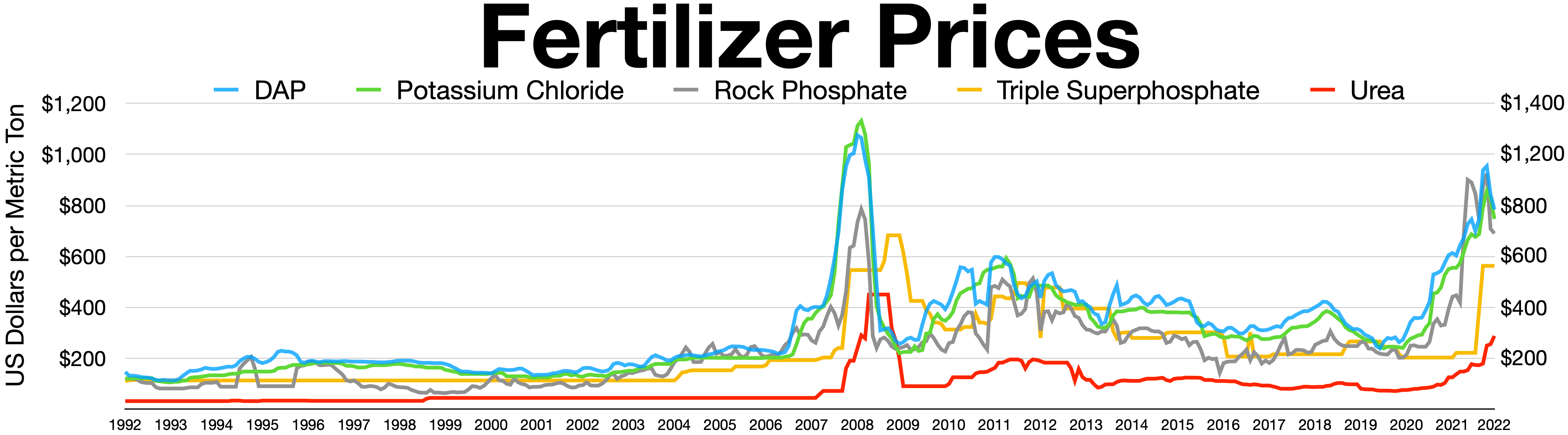
Fertilizer prices 1992-2022. DAP Potassium chloride Phosphorite Triple Superphosphate Urea

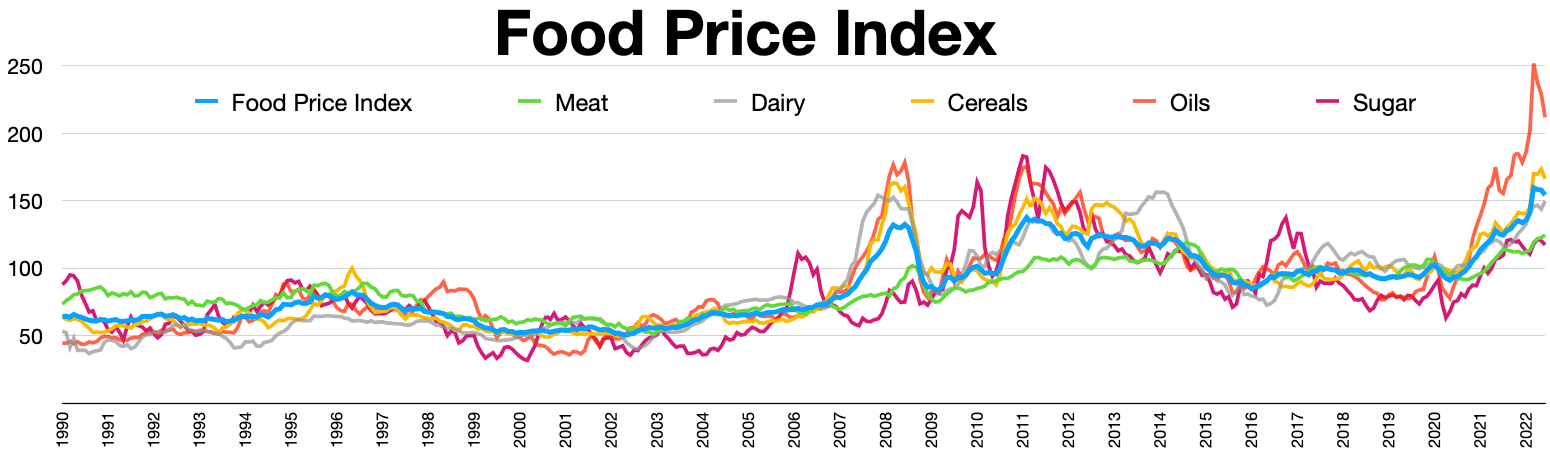
Food Price Index Oils Cereals Dairy Meat sugar

Brent Crude oil spot prices since 1987. A correlation exists between oil prices and the world Food Price Index.

Following the 2007–2008 world food price crisis and a short lull in high prices during 2009, food prices around the world again started to rise in 2010.

To reduce the volatility of food markets and increase market transparency, several measures were considered at the G20 summit in 2010. One of the outcomes was the establishment of the Agricultural Market Information System (AMIS) in 2011.

In April 2011, the World Bank warned that the global economy was "one shock away" from an impending full-scale food price crisis. The high food prices have contributed to worldwide protests particularly in Africa. High food prices were also a major factor contributing to the Arab Spring unrest.

The deflated FAO food price index reached an all time high in 2012. As a result of a very dry summer in the United States and Europe, corn and soybean prices reached all-time highs in July 2012 and prices remained high throughout 2012

One reason for the increase in food prices may be the increase in oil prices at the same time, leading to increased demand for and production of biofuels. For example, the use of maize (corn) for ethanol fuel production rose from 15% of total U.S. maize production in 2006 to 40% in 2012.

Over the next years, prices fell, reaching a low in March 2016 with the deflated FAO food price index close to pre-crisis level of 2006.
