= GDP deflator =

Economic measure

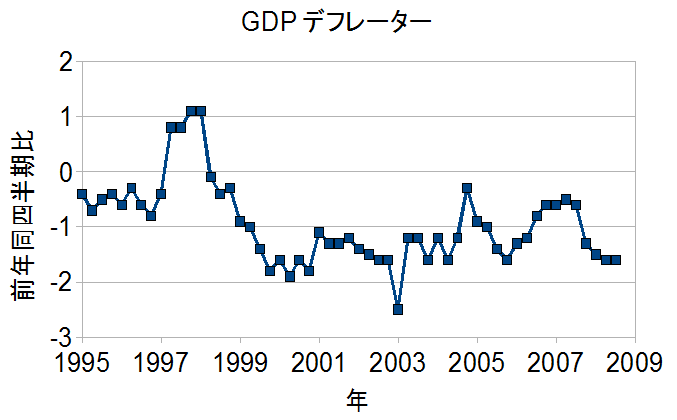
A GDP deflator representing Japan

In economics, the GDP deflator (implicit price deflator) is a measure of the money price of all new, domestically produced, final goods and services in an economy in a year relative to the real value of them. It can be used as a measure of the value of money. GDP stands for gross domestic product, the total monetary value of all final goods and services produced within the territory of a country over a particular period of time (quarterly or annually).

Like the consumer price index (CPI), the GDP deflator is a measure of price inflation/deflation with respect to a specific base year; the GDP deflator of the base year itself is equal to 100. Unlike the CPI, the GDP deflator is not based on a fixed basket of goods and services; the "basket" for the GDP deflator is allowed to change from year to year with people's consumption and investment patterns.

== Calculation ==
=== Measurement in national accounts ===
In most systems of national accounts the GDP deflator measures the ratio of nominal (or current-price) GDP to the real (or chain volume) measure of GDP. The formula used to calculate the deflator is:

$$\operatorname{GDP\ deflator} = \frac{\operatorname{Nominal\ GDP}}{\operatorname{Real\ GDP}}\times 100$$

The nominal GDP of a given year is computed using that year's prices, while the real GDP of that year is computed using the base year's prices.

The formula implies that dividing the nominal GDP by the real GDP and multiplying it by 100 will give the GDP Deflator, hence "deflating" the nominal GDP into a real measure.

It is often useful to consider implicit price deflators for certain subcategories of GDP, such as computer hardware. In this case, it is useful to think of the price deflator as the ratio of the current-year price of a good to its price in some base year. The price in the base year is normalized to 100. For example, for computer hardware, we could define a "unit" to be a computer with a specific level of processing power, memory, hard drive space and so on. A price deflator of 200 means that the current-year price of this computing power is twice its base-year price - price inflation. A price deflator of 50 means that the current-year price is half the base year price - price deflation. This can lead to a situation where official statistics reflect a drop in real prices, even though they nominally have stayed the same.

Unlike some price indices (like the CPI), the GDP deflator is not based on a fixed basket of goods and services. The basket is allowed to change with people's consumption and investment patterns. Specifically, for the GDP deflator, the "basket" in each year is the set of all goods that were produced domestically, weighted by the market value of the total consumption of each good. Therefore, new expenditure patterns are allowed to show up in the deflator as people respond to changing prices. The theory behind this approach is that the GDP deflator reflects up to date expenditure patterns. For instance, if the price of chicken increases relative to the price of beef, people may spend more money on beef as a substitute for chicken.

In practice, the difference between the deflator and a price index like the Consumer price index (CPI) is often relatively small. On the other hand, with governments in developed countries increasingly utilizing price indexes for everything from fiscal and monetary planning to payments to social program recipients, even small differences between inflation measures can shift budget revenues and expenses by millions or billions of dollars.

== See also ==
- Price index
- Étienne Laspeyres
- Hermann Paasche
- Chained volume series (of GDP data.)
- Personal consumption expenditures price index (PCE)
- Inflation
- Gross domestic product (GDP)
