= U.S. Producer Price Index =

Official measure of producer prices in the economy of the United States

United States Producer Price Index (PPI)
Key U.S. Wholesale Economic Indicator

Administration & Metadata
- Maintained By: Bureau of Labor Statistics (BLS)
- Frequency: Monthly
- Base Period: 1982 = 100
- Former Name: Wholesale Price Index (WPI) (Pre-1978)
- First Tracked: 1902

Latest Data (August 2026)
- Final Demand Level: 157.41
- Final Demand (YoY): 5.4%
- Core PPI (YoY): 4.6% (Excludes food & energy)
- Monthly Change (MoM): +0.4% (Seasonally Adjusted)

Structure & Calculation
- Target Universe: Output of entire domestic goods-producing sector (mining, manufacturing, agriculture) plus ~69% of service sector
- Sampling Size: Over 16,000 establishments providing ~64,000 price quotes monthly
- Exclusions: Imported goods, taxes, and distribution costs (wholesale/retail margins)
- Perspective: Measures revenue received by the seller, contrasting with the buyer-centric CPI

Classification Structures
- Core Analytical Frameworks: • Final Demand–Intermediate Demand (FD-ID): Organizes by type of buyer and stage of production flow.; • Commodity-based: Groups products and services by similarity of material or type, regardless of producing industry.; • Industry net-output: Measures price changes for the total output of specific NAICS industries.

Economic Relevance
- Leading Indicator: Anticipates consumer price shifts by tracking cost pass-through from manufacturers to retail baskets
- Business Use: Widely utilized in private commercial contracts for price escalation clauses

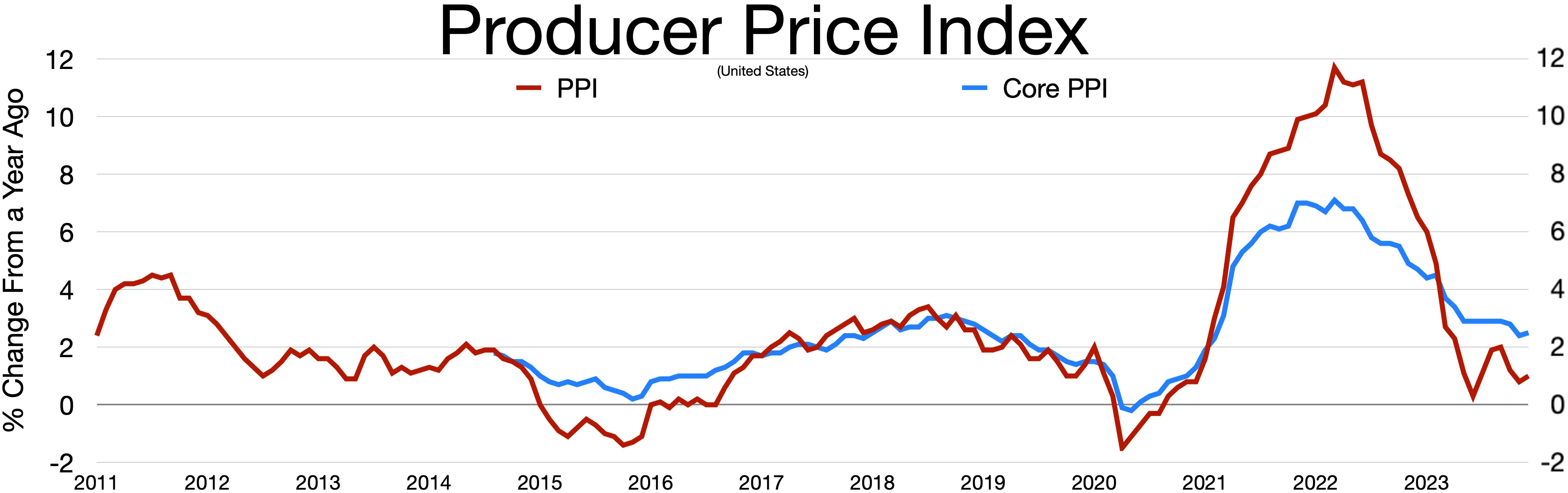
Producer Price Index PPI final demand Core PPI

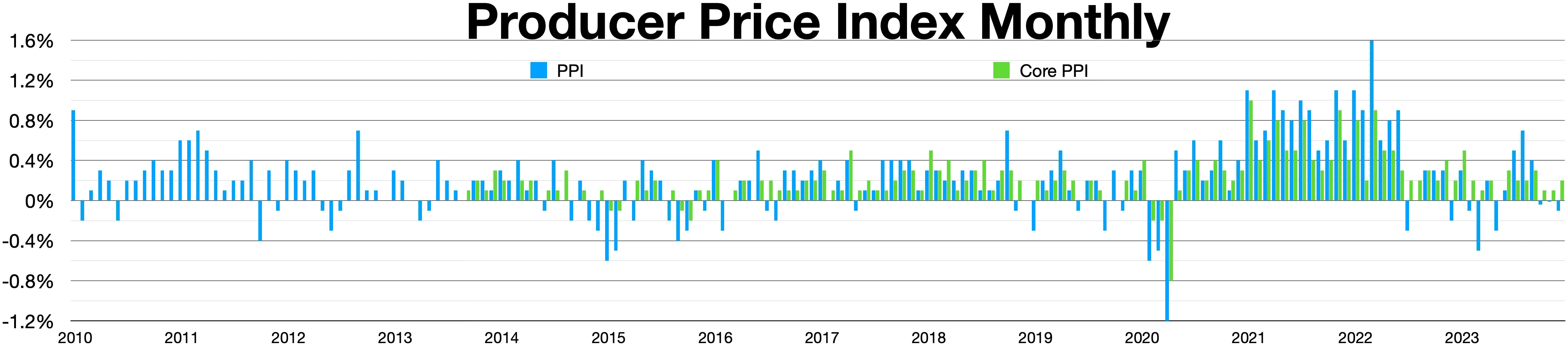
PPI monthly PPI total Core PPI

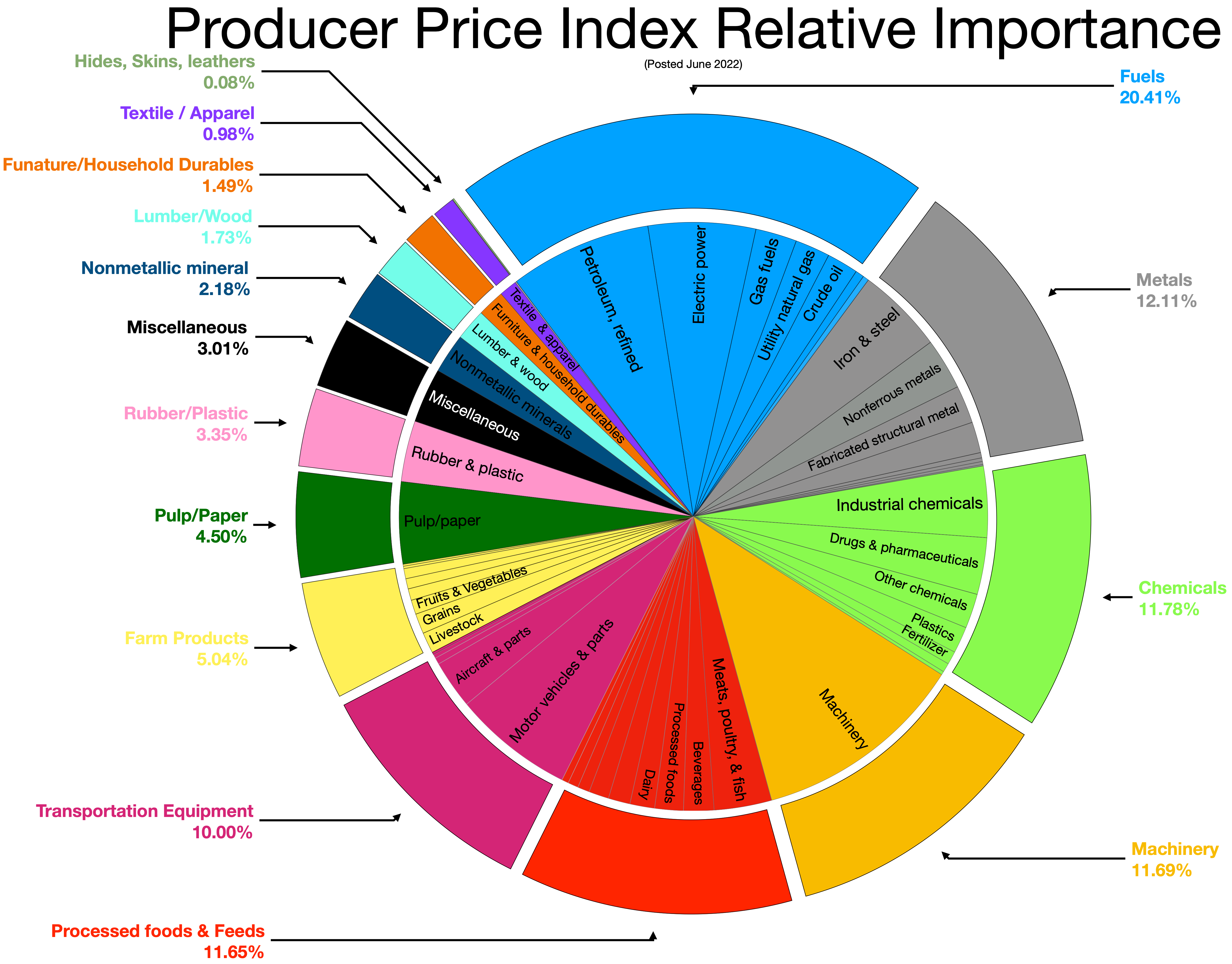
Producer Price Index Relative Importance for commodities Fuels Metals Chemicals Machinery Processed foods & feeds Transportation equipment Farm products Pulp / paper Rubber / plastic Miscellaneous Nonmetallic mineral Lumber / wood Furniture / household goods Textile / apparel Hides, skin, leathers

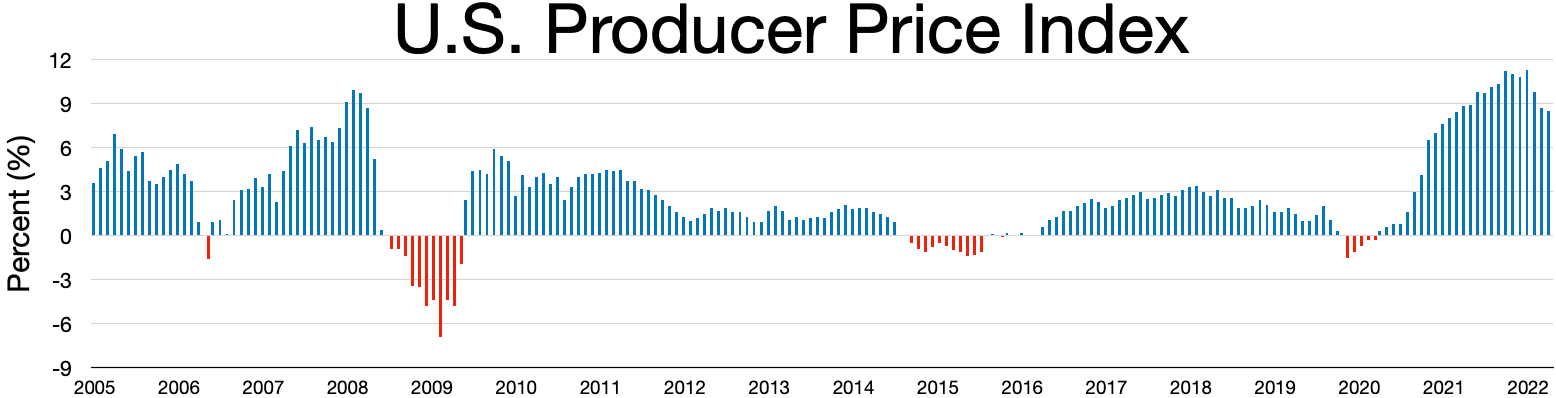
US producer price index (2005–2022)

The Producer Price Index (PPI) is the official measure of producer prices in the economy of the United States. It measures average changes in prices received by domestic producers for their output. The PPI was known as the Wholesale Price Index, or WPI, up to 1978. It is published by the Bureau of Labor Statistics and is one of the oldest economic time series compiled by the Federal government of the United States.

The origins of the index were in an 1891 U.S. Senate resolution authorizing the Senate Committee on Finance to investigate the effects of the tariff laws "upon the imports and exports, the growth, development, production, and prices of agricultural and manufactured articles at home and abroad".

The PPI for Final Demand is the headline index of the PPI News Release. It measures change in prices received by domestic producers for goods, services, and construction sold for personal consumption, capital investment, government, and export.

Most of the data for the PPI is collected through a systematic sampling of producers in manufacturing, mining, and service industries, and is published monthly by the Bureau of Labor Statistics. Virtually every type of mining and manufacturing industry and a majority of service industries are sampled.

Survey respondents participate voluntarily. The data provided by respondents to the BLS is strictly confidential, protected by the Confidential Information Protection and Statistical Efficiency Act (CIPSEA) of 2002.

== Classifications ==
The Producer Price Index family of indexes consists of several classification systems, each with its own structure, history, and uses. However, indexes in all classification systems draw from the same pool of price information provided to the Bureau by survey respondents. The three most important classification structures are industry, commodity, and final demand-intermediate demand (FD-ID).

=== Industry ===
The PPI for an industry measures the average change in prices received for an industry's output sold to another industry. For more than 20 years, the PPI used the Standard Industrial Classification (SIC) system to collect and publish data. This system received criticism for its inability to adapt to changes in the United States economy. Consequently, in January 2004, the BLS began to publish the PPI data in accordance with the North American Industry Classification System (NAICS). This system was developed in cooperation with Canada and Mexico, and categorizes producers into industries based on the activity in which they are primarily engaged.

=== Commodity ===
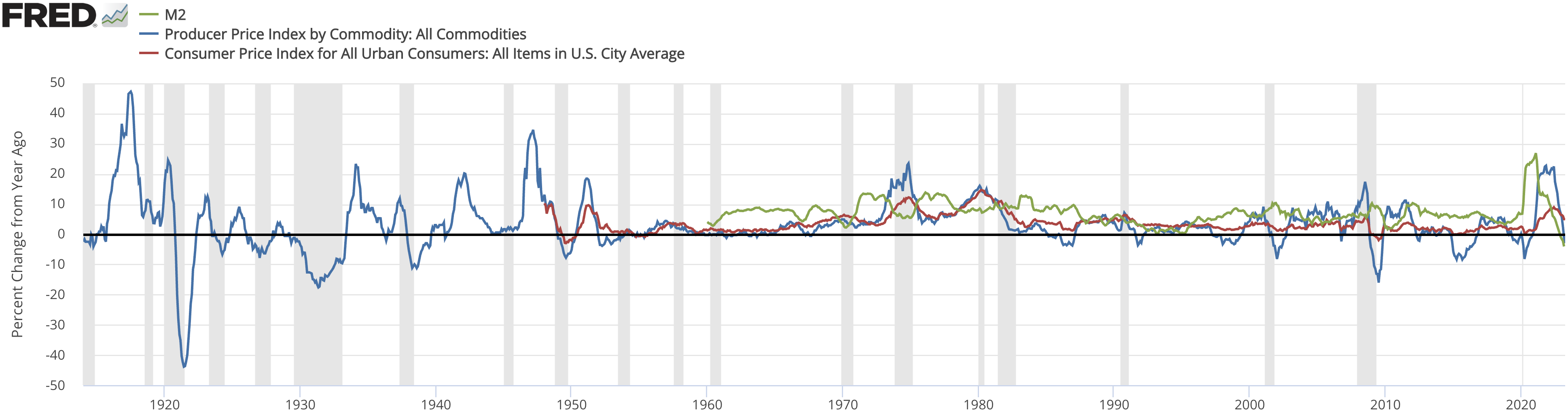
PPI commodities M2 money supply % change year over year Producer price index for commodities United States Consumer Price Index

A PPI from the commodity classification system measures change in prices received for a product or service regardless of industry of origin. It organizes products by similarity, end use, or material composition. This system is unique to the PPI and does not match any other standard coding structure, such as the SIC or the U.N. Standard International Trade Classification (SITC). Historical continuity of index series, the needs of index users, and a variety of ad hoc factors were important in developing the PPI commodity classification.

=== Final Demand-Intermediate Demand (FD-ID) ===
Final Demand-Intermediate Demand (FD-ID) indexes are made up of PPIs in the commodity system. This system regroups commodity indexes to create aggregate PPIs according to the type of buyer and the amount of physical processing or assembly products have undergone. The FD-ID system replaced the PPI "stage-of-processing" (SOP) system as PPI's primary aggregation model with the release of data for January 2014. The scope of the SOP system was narrower than the PPI index. Over 600 FD-ID PPIs are available measuring price change for goods, services, and construction sold to final demand and intermediate demand.

The final demand portion of the FD-ID system measures price change for commodities sold as personal consumption, capital investment, government purchases, and exports. The intermediate demand portion of the FD-ID system tracks price change for goods, services, and construction products sold to businesses as inputs to production, excluding capital investment.

== Calculating Index Changes ==
Movements of price indexes from one month to another are expressed as percent changes, rather than as changes in index points.

Each index measures price changes from a reference period defined to equal 100.0. Currently, some PPIs have an index base set at 1982 = 100, while the remainder have an index base that corresponds with the month prior to the month that the index was introduced. BLS measures price change in relation to that figure. An index level of 110, for example, means there has been a 10% increase in prices since the base period; similarly, an index level of 90 indicates a 10% decrease in prices.

To calculate the percent change in prices between some previous period and a more current period using a PPI, the BLS uses the following formula:

Current period index level - Previous period index level = Index point change
Index point change ÷ Previous period index level = Proportion of change
Proportion of change × 100 = Percent change

For example, in the first quarter of 2016, the PPI for final demand increased 0.5 percent because the index levels were 109.7 in March 2016 and 109.1 in December 2015. The percent change is calculated as:

109.7 - 109.1 = 0.6
0.6 ÷ 109.1 = 0.005
0.005 × 100 = 0.5 percent

== Core PPI ==
The Core PPI is the headline PPI excluding high volatility items, such as energy. The more volatile components of the PPI for final demand are food, energy, and trade services. These indexes, including Final demand less foods and energy and Final demand less foods, energy, and trade services, exclude volatility from certain components.

== How PPI differs from CPI ==
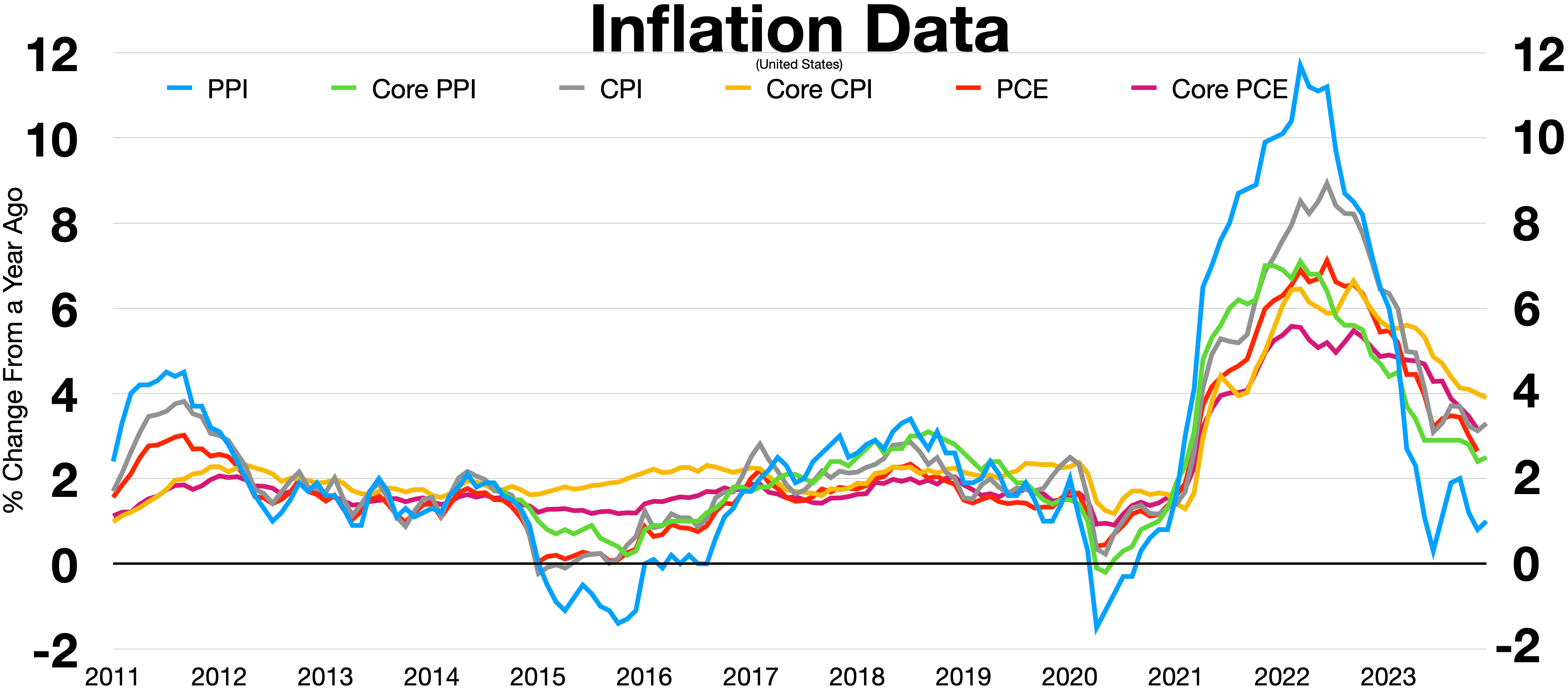
PPI is a leading indicator, CPI and PCE lag PPI Core PPI CPI Core CPI PCE Core PCE

A change in the PPI often anticipates a change in the United States Consumer Price Index (CPI). However, there are times when the CPI exhibits a change of a significantly different magnitude (or direction) compared to the PPI. This is due to the different definition and uses of the two indices. A primary use of the PPI is to deflate revenue streams in order to measure real growth in output. A primary use of the CPI is to adjust income and expenditure streams for changes in the cost of living. Because of these differences, each uses prices from a different set of commodities and services.

== See also ==
- Producer price index
- Bureau of Labor Statistics
- Consumer Price Index
- U.S. Import and Export Price Indices
- Inflation
- Substitution
- FRED (Federal Reserve Economic Data)
- 2000s commodities boom
- 2020s commodities boom
