= Laspeyres =

Laspeyres is a surname. Notable people with the surname include:

- Étienne Laspeyres (1834–1913), German economist
- Jakob Heinrich Laspeyres (1769–1809), German entomologist
