= Headline inflation =

Economic measure of overall inflation

Headline inflation is a statistical measure of aggregate price movement within an economy, usually expressed as percentage change in the Consumer Price Index (or other price indices) over a specific time period. It is typically measured using a comprehensive array of goods and services, including commercial products such as food and energy (e.g., oil and gas), which tend to be much more subject to price fluctuations and prone to inflationary spikes. On the other hand, "core inflation" (also non-food-manufacturing or underlying inflation) is commonly calculated from a consumer price index minus the volatile food and energy components.

Headline inflation, alongside core inflation, are among the key economic data produced by various national statistical agencies. It is often used as standard indicator of changes in cost of living and is being targeted by most central banks to influence price stability.

== Usage ==
=== Monetary policy ===
Major central banks have mandates that spell out their price stability goals in terms of headline inflation using the Consumer Price Index (CPI), such as the Bank of England, Bank of Japan, Reserve Bank of Australia, and Reserve Bank of India. The European Central Bank also aims at headline inflation but using its own Harmonized Index of Consumer Prices.

In the United States, however, the Federal Open Market Committee (FOMC) focuses on the Personal Consumption Expenditures (PCE) price index" (specifically its core inflation). This index is based on a dynamic consumption basket as determined from the US National Accounts which also includes the Gross Domestic Product, rather than the fixed goods' basket as was the case for the CPI. Previously, the FOMC's inflation outlook was presented in terms of the CPI.

Since February 2000, the Federal Reserve Board’s semiannual monetary policy reports to the US Congress have described the Board’s outlook for inflation in terms of the PCE. In explaining its preference for the PCE, the Board stated:

The chain-type price PCE index draws extensively on data from the consumer price index but, while not entirely free of measurement problems, has several advantages relative to the CPI. The PCE chain-type index is constructed from a formula that reflects the changing composition of spending and thereby avoids some of the upward bias associated with the fixed-weight nature of the CPI. In addition, the weights are based on a more comprehensive measure of expenditures. Finally, historical data used in the PCE price index can be revised to account for newly available information and for improvements in measurement techniques, including those that affect source data from the CPI; the result is a more consistent series over time. —Monetary Policy Report to the Congress, Federal Reserve Board of Governors, Feb. 17, 2000

However, the former President of the Federal Reserve Bank of St. Louis James B. Bullard explained that the FOMC still takes headline PCE into account, and that since 2008 (during the 2008 financial crisis) the FOMC has included forecasts for both types of inflation (i.e. CPI and PCE) in its semiannual "Monetary Policy Report" for the United States Congress. He emphasized that "the Fed's main concern is long-run headline inflation and the prices people actually pay."

=== Indexation ===
The CPI is still used for many purposes, for example, for indexing social security. The equivalent of the CPI is also commonly used by central banks of other countries when measuring inflation. The CPI is presented monthly in the US by the Bureau of Labor Statistics, while the PCE is reported by the Bureau of Economic Analysis.

== See also ==
- 2007–2008 world food price crisis
- Inflationism
- Inflation hedge – Investment intended to protect an investor against inflation or hedge
