= Market basket =

Commodity bundles, used to track inflation

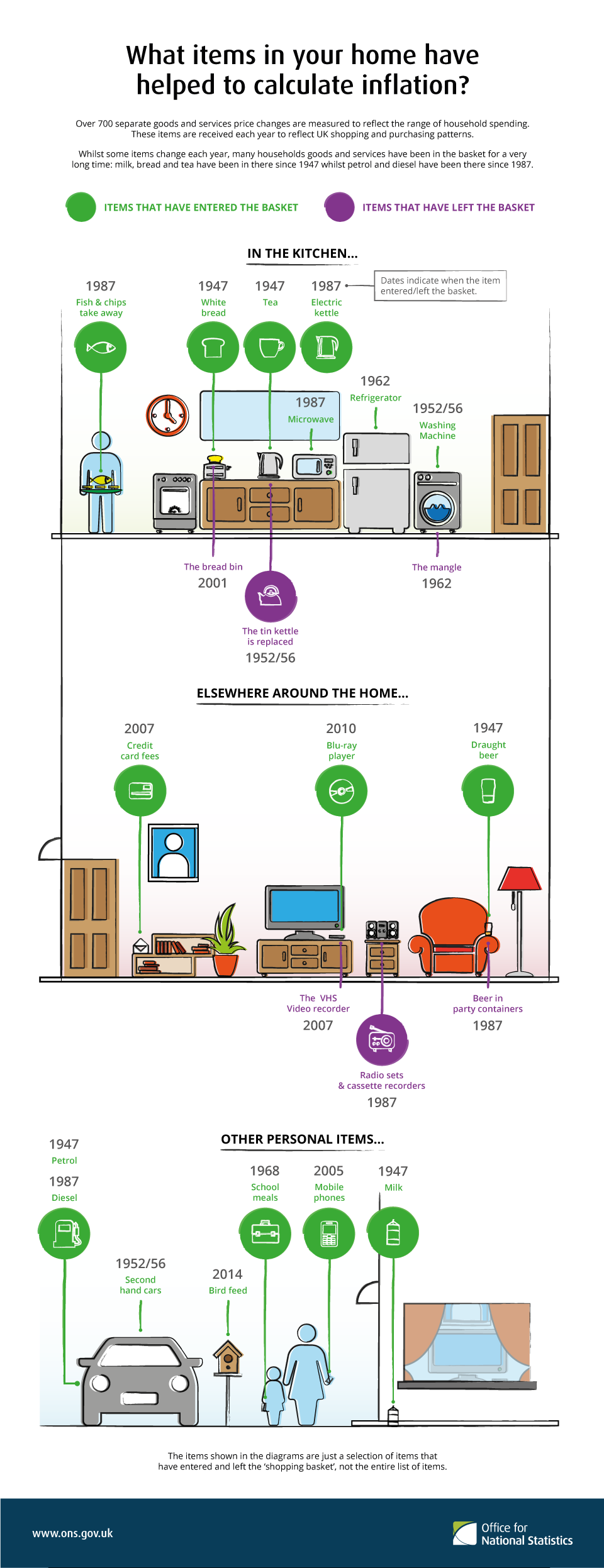
What makes up the basket of goods?

A market basket or commodity bundle is a fixed list of items, in given proportions. Its most common use is to track the progress of inflation in an economy or specific market. That is, to measure the changes in the value of money over time. A market basket is also used with the theory of purchasing price parity to measure the value of money in different places.

== Consumer basket ==
The most common type of market basket is the basket of consumer goods used to define the Consumer Price Index (CPI), often called the consumer basket. It is a sample of goods and services, offered at the consumer market.

In the United States, the sample is determined by Consumer Expenditure Surveys conducted by the Bureau of Labor Statistics. The price collection is conducted by data collectors on a monthly basis, and is processed further by commodity specialists.

== Food basket ==
Food basket can refer to any market basket of food products, but is often used when the products are expected to meet basic nutritional needs. The term basic food basket is also used for the latter.

== Other baskets ==
Other types of baskets are used to define the Producer Price Index (PPI), previously known as the Wholesale Price Index (WPI), as well as various commodity price indices.

The GDP deflator essentially uses a basket made of every good in the economy, in proportion to the amount produced.

== Issues ==
When measuring inflation or PPP, there are difficulties in selecting the goods that are common at both places in time (for inflation) or space (for PPP).

When measuring inflation, we must find goods that exist at different points in time and, ideally, have similar utility to consumers at those times. This is difficult. For example, cars might be common purchases today, but they didn't exist in 1900, when horses were used for transportation. So, even though transportation is important, putting a car in the basket is problematic. This problem exists over short timespans, because the concept of "car" changes with time. The cars of today last longer and go faster than the cars of only a few years ago. Researchers measuring inflation usually include "transportation" in their basket, because it is an important consumer purchase, but they must account for these differences in the transportation by other means.

When measuring PPP, there are similar issues. In different parts of the world, different goods might play similar roles in the economy. So, a researcher measuring PPP might need to account for rice's popularity in China and corn (maize)'s popularity in the USA. Also, fashion and culture may dictate that certain goods may have drastically different utilities in different places. For example, beef is not valued in Hindu areas and pork is not valued in Muslim areas.

Some approaches account for these differences by having two baskets and averaging the inflation or PPP of them. For example, a basket of goods consumers bought in 1900 and a separate basket of goods consumers buy today. After computing the price of each basket in 1900 and today, the inflation over the time period is an average of the increase in the two baskets. A common usage of this two-basket-averaging is the GDP deflator, where the basket contains every good produced in the economy at a given point in time.

== See also ==
- Market basket analysis - a distinct concept in data mining involving the analysis of items frequently purchased together
