= U.S. Import and Export Price Indexes =

The U.S. Import and Export Price Indexes measure average changes in prices of goods and services that are imported to or exported from the U.S.. The indexes are produced monthly by the International Price Program (IPP) of the Bureau of Labor Statistics. The Import and Export Price Indexes were published quarterly starting in 1974 and monthly since 1989.

== History of the International Price Program ==
The origins of the International Price Program (IPP) can be traced to a 1961 report on Federal Price Statistics prepared by the National Bureau of Economic Research. The report for Congress' Joint Economic Committee suggested that indexes be assigned to a federal statistical agency "to obtain the attention and resources for these indexes that we believe are essential." A further study undertaken for NBER by Professors Irving Kravis and Robert Lipsey gave more impetus to the project. In their study, "Price Competitiveness in World Trade," Kravis and Lipsey outlined the need for such measures and the feasibility of producing them. During this time, the Bureau's Division of Price and Index Number Research began research on the feasibility of producing import and export price indexes. The IPP was a result of this research and was established as an ongoing program in 1971.

The IPP produced its first annual international price indexes in 1973. Largely as a response to changing international economic conditions and the need on the part of both the Federal Government and the private sector to obtain these data on a more timely basis, collection and publication of international price indexes were begun on a quarterly basis in 1974. The IPP increased the commodity area coverage and detail of its indexes as more samples were initiated.

In 1982 full coverage in the import and export goods categories was available and the Office of Management and Budget placed the IPP indexes on its list of Principal Federal Economic Indicators together with the Consumer Price Index and Producer Price Index. The IPP continued to expand by introducing selected services indexes. Various transportation services indexes were added to the IPP in the late 1980s. Research is continuing on other international services as data and resources become available. Beginning in 1989, BLS began producing a limited number of indexes on a monthly basis. With the release of March 1992 data, IPP added import locality of origin indexes, and in January 1993 began monthly publication of the major merchandise indexes. In 2005, the IPP expanded its output of import price indexes based on locality of origin to include France, Germany, the United Kingdom, the Pacific Rim, the Association of South East Asian Nations (ASEAN), and the Asia Near East.

With the release of the February 2025 U.S. Import and Export Price Indexes news release on March 18, 2025, the official measures were greatly expanded due to the use of non-survey sourced prices. The incorporation of U.S. administrative data into the indexes for more homogeneous product areas led to the increased publication of hundreds of additional import and export price indexes. U.S. importers and exporters are required to report international trade transactions to the U.S. Customs and Border Protection Agency and the U.S. Department of Commerce. These administrative trade records are subsequently processed by the U.S. Census Bureau to calculate the official measure of U.S. trade.

== Scope of the Export and Import Price Indexes ==
The target universe of the import and export price indexes consist of all goods and services sold by U.S. residents to foreign buyers (exports) and purchased from abroad by U.S. residents (imports). Custom or unique items, such as works of art, are excluded as they do not allow for matched-item pricing over time. Products that may be purchased on the open market for military use are included, but goods exclusively for military use are excluded. Air passenger fares and air freight prices are also tracked by the IPP.

== Data sources ==
The relevant price data is obtained both from U.S. administrative trade data and from a fielded survey directed at U.S. importers and exporters. While the administrative data comes from filings that are required of U.S. importers and exporters, survey participation is voluntary, and cooperation of survey respondents in providing data is necessary for the Bureau to perform its responsibilities as mandated by Congress. The data collected by the Bureau of Labor Statistics is strictly confidential. The Confidential Information Protection and Statistical Efficiency Act of 2002 (Title 5 of Public Law 107-347) protects the confidentiality of the data provided by the respondents.

The import merchandise sampling frames are obtained from the U.S. Customs Service. The export merchandise sampling frames are obtained from the Canadian Border Services Agency for exports to Canada and from the Bureau of the Census for exports to the rest of the world. Data sources for services are researched and developed separately for each category. For example, the Department of Transportation provides the sampling frames for the air freight price indexes. The reference period for a sampling frame is generally the most recent available 12 months.

Calculation weights are derived from the dollar values found on the sampling frames and from trade dollar values compiled by the Bureau of the Census for the base year.

== Calculating index changes ==
Movements of price indexes from one month to another usually should be expressed as percent changes, rather than as changes in index points, because the latter are affected by the level of the index in relation to its base period, while the former are not. Each index measures price changes from a reference period defined to equal 100.0.

An increase of 20 percent from the base period in the Export Price Index, for example, is shown as 120.0, which can be expressed in dollars as follows: "Prices received by domestic producers of a systematic sample of finished goods have risen from $100 in the base period, December 2001, to $120 today." Likewise, a current index of 133.3 would indicate that prices received by producers of export goods today are one-third higher than what they were in December 2001.

== See also ==
- Bureau of Labor Statistics
- Consumer Price Index
- Producer Price Index
- Inflation
- FRED (Federal Reserve Economic Data)
