= Inflationary spike =

An inflationary spike occurs when a particular section of the economy experiences a sudden price rise possibly due to external factors.

== Examples ==
For example, if a large amount of crop is destroyed, the value of the remaining crop will rise sharply.

Another example was when the sharp decreases in the supply of oil occurred in 1973 and 1978, there were immediate inflationary spikes in Canada.

Furthermore, the expansive fiscal response to the COVID-19 Pandemic in the United States also lead to such an increase.

== Measuring overall or core inflation ==
This will distort the overall measure of inflation (headline inflation).

Core inflation seeks to avoid the influence of these spikes by excluding areas of the economy such as food and energy which may be susceptible to such shocks.

== See also ==
- Hyperinflation
- Shock (economics)
- Wage-price spiral
