= Volume index =

A volume index or quantity index is a numerical time series measure designed to help compare how the production of some class of goods and/or services, taken as a whole, differs between time periods or geographical locations. Compare price index.

As compared to a price index, a volume index takes into account price changes and reflects the level of production without inflation.

Volume or quantity indexes can be constructed by year-to-year chaining just as price indexes can be.

== See also ==
- Gross domestic product
