= Rice Vaughan =

Rice Vaughan (d. circa 1672) was a seventeenth-century Anglo-Welsh lawyer and economist known for writing a seminal work on economics and currencies entitled A Discourse on Coins and Coinage.

== Biography ==
Rice Vaughan was the "second son of Henry Vaughan of Gelli-goch, Machynlleth, and Mary, daughter of Maurice Wynn of Glyn, near Harlech." He graduated from the Shrewsbury School in 1615 and later in life entered Gray's Inn for a career in the law before being admitted to the bar in 1648. During the English Civil War, he sided with parliament against King Charles I. He is thought to have died before the publication of his works, the earliest in 1672.

== Works ==
- 1651: A Plea for the Common Laws of England (a reply to Hugh Peter's A Good Work for a Good Magistrate; Practica Walliae, or, The Proceedings in the Great Sessions of Wales (published posthumously, in 1672)
- 1675: A Discourse of Coin and Coinage (published posthumously and edited by poet, Henry Vaughan)

== A Discourse of Coin and Coinage ==
Vaughan wrote an early work on currency, A Discourse of Coin and Coinage (1675). He argued that it was a mass voluntary consensus, the "concurrence of mankind", that gave currency its value as a medium of exchange, not the laws which enforce the usage of currency or the inherent worth of a currency's material composition (such as gold or silver). This work also contained the earliest known research on price level changes and price indices. John Ramsay McCulloch included A Discourse... in his A Select Collection of Scarce and Valuable Tracts on Money (1856).
