= Richard Witting =

Prussian politician and financier

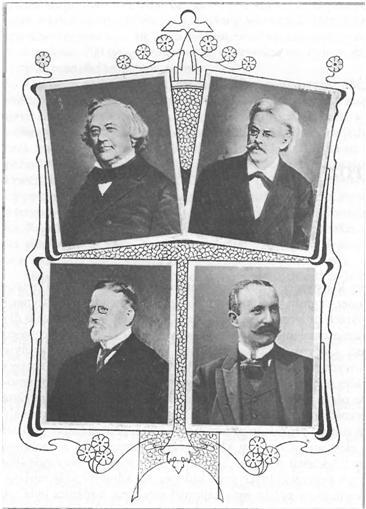

Richard Witting (born: Witkowski; 19 October 1856, Berlin – 22 December 1923, Berlin) was a Prussian politician and financier.

Witting studied law at Göttingen, where he became member of Burschenschaft Hannovera (fraternity), and later became mayor of Poznań in 1891–1902. From 1902 to 1910 he was director of Nationalbank für Deutschland. Witting was a brother of Maximilian Harden and father-in-law of Hans Paasche. Witting is considered one of the major authors (fathers) of the democratic Weimar Constitution, which he and Hugo Preuß worked out in first drafts. He was also a convert to Lutheran Protestantism from Judaism, a common practice of this epoch.
