= Federal Reserve Economic Data =

Online database maintained by St. Louis Federal Reserve Bank

Federal Reserve Economic Data (FRED) is a database maintained by the Research Division of the Federal Reserve Bank of St. Louis that provides access to more than 816,000 economic time series from hundreds of public and private sources. The database includes data on banking, business and fiscal conditions, consumer price indexes, employment and population, exchange rates, gross domestic product, interest rates, monetary aggregates, producer price indexes, reserves and monetary base, U.S. trade and international transactions, and financial markets. FRED aggregates data from U.S. government agencies, state institutions, universities, nonprofit organizations, trade associations, and private companies, including sources such as the United States Census Bureau, the Bureau of Labor Statistics, Zillow, and the National Association of Realtors.

== History ==
FRED was created by the Federal Reserve Bank of St. Louis to improve public access to economic and financial data. Over time, the platform expanded from a relatively small collection of U.S. macroeconomic indicators into a large-scale aggregation service containing domestic and international economic data from hundreds of providers.

The platform is widely used by economists, researchers, journalists, students, policymakers, and participants in financial markets for economic analysis and forecasting.

== Data organization ==
FRED organizes economic information primarily as time series ("series") consisting of dated observations. Series are associated with statistical releases and data sources, while categories and tags provide systems for browsing and metadata classification.

Concept	Description
Source	An institution or organization that provides data published through FRED
Release	A statistical publication or dataset grouping associated with one or more sources
Series	An individual economic time series consisting of dated observations
Observation	A dated value within a series
Category	A hierarchical classification used to organize and browse series
Tag	A metadata label used for search and cross-classification
Vintage (ALFRED)	A historical snapshot of a series as available at a specific point in time

Categories form a hierarchical browsing structure, while tags provide non-hierarchical metadata relationships across series. Individual series may appear in multiple categories and may be associated with numerous tags.

== Services ==
=== ALFRED ===
ALFRED (Archival Federal Reserve Economic Data) provides access to vintage versions of economic data that were available at specific points in time. The service allows researchers to examine historical revisions to economic statistics and reproduce analyses using data available at earlier dates.

=== GeoFRED ===
GeoFRED is a geographic mapping tool that displays selected FRED data series using color-coded visualizations at the state, metropolitan statistical area, and county levels.

=== FRASER ===
FRASER (Federal Reserve Archival System for Economic Research) is a digital archive created by the Federal Reserve Bank of St. Louis to preserve and provide access to historical economic publications and documents related to the history of the United States financial system and the Federal Reserve System.

The archive includes:

- Publications of the Federal Reserve Board of Governors
- Publications of Federal Reserve Banks
- Speeches and archival materials of Federal Reserve policymakers
- Government statistical publications
- Congressional hearings
- Economic reports and books

FRASER was developed in collaboration with libraries, government agencies, and academic institutions.

=== CASSIDI ===
CASSIDI is a data service that provides information about banking market structures, banking markets, and depository institutions within the United States.

=== IDEAS and RePEc integration ===
The St. Louis Fed Research division also hosts IDEAS, a bibliographic database associated with Research Papers in Economics (RePEc), which indexes economic research papers, articles, and working papers from academic and research institutions worldwide.

== Usage and influence ==
FRED data are widely used in academic research, financial markets, journalism, and public policy analysis. The platform is commonly used for economic forecasting, macroeconomic analysis, and reproducible research.

The availability of machine-readable data and public APIs has contributed to the widespread adoption of FRED within quantitative finance, economics, and data science communities.

In a 2012 Business Insider article, economist Paul Krugman described FRED as an essential tool for real-time economic analysis.

== API and software ecosystem ==
FRED provides a public web API that allows users to programmatically access economic data and metadata published through the platform. The API follows a REST architecture and returns data in formats including JSON and XML. Access requires registration for an API key used to authenticate requests.

The API supports retrieval of time series observations, releases, categories, tags, and related metadata associated with FRED datasets. Users may query individual series, filter observations by date ranges, and retrieve metadata describing data sources, units, frequencies, and seasonal adjustment methods.

The FRED API has supported the development of third-party libraries, integrations, and open-source software for statistical and programming environments including R, Python, Ruby, Julia, and command-line interfaces. Examples include fredr, an R package used for economic data analysis, and RESERVE, an open-source command-line interface for interacting with the FRED API.

The API is widely used by researchers, analysts, developers, and financial market participants to integrate economic data into statistical software, forecasting systems, financial models, and research applications.

The Federal Reserve Bank of St. Louis provides citation guidelines for FRED data and associated metadata.

== FRED economic indicators (partial list) ==
SERIES	CATEGORY	SUB-CATEGORY	INDICATOR	PERIOD
TREAST	Finance	Monetary Data	US Treasuries Held by the Fed	W
WSHOMCB	Finance	Monetary Data	Mortgage Backed Sec Held by the Fed	W
WALCL	Banking	Monetary Factors	All Fed Reserve Banks - Total Assets	W
TLAAC	Banking	Monetary Factors	All Commercial Banks - Total Assets	W
TOTBKCR	Banking	Commercial Credit	Bank Credit of All Commercial Banks	W
TOTALSEC	Banking	Commercial Credit	Securitized Total Consumer Loans	M
TOTALSL	Banking	Commercial Credit	Total Consumer Credit Outstanding	M
INVEST	Banking	Investment	Total Investments All Commercial Banks	M
USGSEC	Banking	Investment	US Treasury and Agency Securities at All Commercial Banks	M
CONSUMER	Banking	Loans	Total Consumer Loans	M
BUSLOANS	Banking	Loans	Total Commercial/Industrial Loans	M
DALLCACBEP	Banking	Delinquencies	Delinquencies On All Loans And Leases	M
T10Y2Y	Banking	Interest Rates	US 10-YR / 2-YR Spread	W
TB3MS	Banking	Interest Rates	3-Month T-Bill: Secondary Market Rate	W
DGS10	Banking	Interest Rates	10-Yr Treasury Const. Maturity Rate	W
GFDEBTN	Business/Fiscal	Federal Government	Federal Government Debt (Public)	Y
FYOINT	Business/Fiscal	Federal Government	Interest on National Debt	Y
FYONET	Business/Fiscal	Federal Government	Federal Spending	Y
FYFR	Business/Fiscal	Federal Government	Federal Receipts	Y
FYFSD	Business/Fiscal	Federal Government	Budget Deficit/Surplus	Y
CDSP	Business/Fiscal	Household Sector	Consumer Debt/Income Ratio	Q
PERMIT	Business/Fiscal	Household Sector	New Home Permits	M
HSN1F	Business/Fiscal	Household Sector	New Home Sales	M
CMDEBT	Business/Fiscal	Household Sector	Outstanding Mortgage Debt	Q
DGORDER	Business/Fiscal	Ind. Production	Manufacturers' New Orders	M
TCU	Business/Fiscal	Ind. Production	Capacity Utilization: Total Industry	M
TTLCONS	Business/Fiscal	Construction	Total Construction Spending	M
BUSINV	Business/Fiscal	Other	Total Business Inventories	M
ALTSALES	Business/Fiscal	Other	Light Weight Vehicle Sales	M
UMCSENT	Business/Fiscal	Other	Univ of Michigan: Consumer Sentiment	M
STLFSI	Business/Fiscal	Other	St. Louis Financial Stress Index	W
OILPRICE	Business/Fiscal	Other	Spot Oil Price - West Texas Intermediate	M
CPIAUCSL	Consumer Prices	CPI	Consumer Price Index: Seasonally Adj.	M
UNRATE	Empl & Population	Household Survey	Civilian Total Unemployment Rate	M
UEMP27OV	Empl & Population	Household Survey	Long Term Unemployment: >27 WKS	M
UEMPMED	Empl & Population	Household Survey	Length of Unemployment	M
CE16OV	Empl & Population	Household Survey	Total US Workforce	M
EMRATIO	Empl & Population	Household Survey	US Employment/Population Ratio	M
POP	Empl & Population	Population	US Population	M
AHEMAN	Empl & Population	Est. Survey	Avg Hourly Earnings: Manufacturing	M
AWHMAN	Empl & Population	Est. Survey	Avg Weekly Hours: Manufacturing	M
AWOTMAN	Empl & Population	Est. Survey	Avg Weekly OT Hours: Manufacturing	M
DEXUSUK	Exchange Rates	Daily Rates	USD/GBP Currency Exchange Rate	D
DEXUSEU	Exchange Rates	Daily Rates	USD/EUR Currency Exchange Rate	D
DEXJPUS	Exchange Rates	Daily Rates	JPN/USD Currency Exchange Rate	D
DEXMXUS	Exchange Rates	Daily Rates	MXP/USD Currency Exchange Rate	D
DEXCAUS	Exchange Rates	Daily Rates	CAD/USD Currency Exchange Rate	D
DEXCHUS	Exchange Rates	Daily Rates	CNY/USD Currency Exchange Rate	D
COMPOUT	Financial Data	Monetary	Commercial Paper Outstanding	W
VIXCLS	Financial Data	Volatility Inexes	CBOE Volatility Index	D
GDP	GDP & Components	GDP/GNP	US Gross Domestic Product	Q
GNP	GDP & Components	GDP/GNP	US Gross National Product	Q
GDI	GDP & Components	GDP/GNP	US Gross Domestic Income	Q
NETFI	GDP & Components	Imports & Exports	US Current Account Balance	Q
EXPGS	GDP & Components	Imports & Exports	US Exports Goods & Services	Q
IMPGS	GDP & Components	Imports & Exports	US Imports Goods & Services	Q
DGI	GDP & Components	Govt Accounting	Fed Govt: Defense Budget	Q
FGRECPT	GDP & Components	Govt Accounting	Fed Govt: Tax Receipts	Q
TGDEF	GDP & Components	Govt Accounting	Fed Govt: Budget Deficit	Q
CP	GDP & Components	Industry	Corporate Profits After Tax	Q
DIVIDEND	GDP & Components	Industry	Corporate Dividends	Q
PI	GDP & Components	Personal	Personal Income	M
PSAVE	GDP & Components	Savings & Inv.	Personal Savings	Q
PSAVERT	GDP & Components	Savings & Inv.	Personal Savings Rate	M
MORTGAGE30US	Interest Rates	30yr Mortgage	30-yr Conventional Mortgage Rate	W
DPCREDIT	Interest Rates	FRB Rates	Discount Rate	D
FEDFUNDS	Interest Rates	FRB Rates	Effective Federal Funds Rate	M
M1	Monetary Aggregates	M1	M1 Money Supply	M
M2	Monetary Aggregates	M2	M2 Money Supply	M
M1V	Monetary Aggregates	M1	Velocity of M1 Money Stock	M
M2V	Monetary Aggregates	M2	Velocity of M2 Money Stock	M
PPIACO	Producer Prices	PPI	Producer Price Index: All Commodities	M
IMPCH	Trade	Imports	Imports from China	M
IMPJP	Trade	Imports	Imports from Japan	M
IMPMX	Trade	Imports	Imports from Mexico	M
IMPCA	Trade	Imports	Imports from Canada	M
IMPGE	Trade	Imports	Imports from Germany	M
IMPUK	Trade	Imports	Imports from UK	M
EXPCH	Trade	Exports	Exports to China	M
EXPJP	Trade	Exports	Exports to Japan	M
EXPMX	Trade	Exports	Exports to Mexico	M
EXPCA	Trade	Exports	Exports to Canada	M
EXPGE	Trade	Exports	Exports to Germany	M
EXPUK	Trade	Exports	Exports to UK	M
BOPGEXP	Trade	Exports	Exports: Goods	M
BOPGIMP	Trade	Imports	Imports: Goods	M
BOPGTB	Trade	Balance	Balance: Goods	M
BOPGSXP	Trade	Exports	Exports: Services	M
BOPSIMP	Trade	Imports	Imports: Services	M
BOPSTB	Trade	Balance	Balance: Services	M
BOPGSTB	Trade	Balance	Balance: Goods & Services	M

== See also ==
- Federal Reserve Bank of St. Louis
