= Robert E. Lipsey =

Robert E. Lipsey (1926 – August 11, 2011) was an American economist associated with National Bureau of Economic Research and Queens College, City University of New York. He is known for his contributions to the U.S. Import and Export Price Indexes.

== Biography ==
Lipsey grew up in Bronx, New York, the son of Russian Jewish immigrants. He graduated from the Bronx High School of Science, took lessons in music at the Juilliard School, and received his B.A. from Columbia University. He joined the National Bureau of Economic Research as a research assistant on recommendation from his advisor Arthur F. Burns and began a 66-year affiliation with the agency, where his research covered government spending as well as price trends in U.S. trade. He was one of the original members of the NBER's Conference on Research in Income and Wealth. He obtained his Ph.D. from Columbia in 1961 with a thesis that offered comprehensive price indexes of U.S. imports and exports from the years 1879 to 1913.

Lipsey was a lecturer at Columbia from 1961 to 1964 and taught at Queens College from 1967 to 1995, while also affiliated with the Graduate Center, CUNY.

Lipsey worked with University of Pennsylvania professor Irving Kravis in the measurement of export and import price levels. Their research explained why price levels are higher in developed economies than lesser developed ones and found a positive correlation between the price levels of tradable goods to income and a negative correlation between the ratio of tradables to non-tradables and income due to the higher labor intensity involved in services.

Lipsey also made contributions to the study of foreign direct investment by seeing it through a microeconomic lens as opposed to a traditional macroeconomic view, integrating the role of multinationals into empirical analysis of trade and investment flows. His research looked at the impact of foreign direct investment on wages, labor competitiveness, exports and production.

He was made a fellow of the American Statistical Association in 1967.

== Personal life ==
Lipsey died on August 11, 2011, at age 84.
