= Magnus Schwantje =

German author and activist (1877–1959)

- Born: Magnus Ernst Schwantje; 3 June 1877; Oldenburg, German Empire
- Died: 11 September 1959 (aged 82); Oberhausen, West Germany
- Occupations: Author, activist

Magnus Ernst Schwantje (3 June 1877 – 11 September 1959) was a German author and activist. He was a campaigner for pacifism, animal rights and vegetarianism, founding the Bund für radikale Ethik ("Alliance for Radical Ethics") and co-founding the Bund der Kriegsdienstgegner ("Alliance of Enemies of Military Service").

== Biography ==
=== Early life and education ===
Magnus Ernst Schwantje was born on 3 June 1877, in Oldenburg, German Empire, the youngest of four siblings. His parents managed a small textile business, but economic hardships forced him to leave secondary school at the age of 14 and pursue an apprenticeship in bookselling. Raised in a Protestant-Baptist family, Schwantje grew up with strong religious influences. However, he later rejected religious faith and considered metaphysical and theological questions to be beyond human understanding. His ethical framework was built on rational thought rather than religious doctrine.

Schwantje's compassion for animals developed early in life, particularly due to the widespread cruelty toward animals in the 19th century, when legal protections were minimal. He famously recalled being moved by an article on vivisection in his youth, which led him to vow to campaign against such practices as an adult.

Schwantje initially hoped that his apprenticeship in bookselling would eventually equip him with the skills necessary to pursue a career as a writer. To expand his knowledge, he taught himself English, French, and Latin. In 1898, at the age of 21, he earned the "intermediate school leaving certificate" through an external university.

=== Career ===
After completing his training, Schwantje moved to Munich (1895–1897), where he was introduced to the popular Theosophy movement. However, he soon grew disillusioned with it and distanced himself from its teachings. At the age of 19, he published his first book, Das edle Waidwerk und der Lustmord ("The Noble Hunt and the Lust Murder"; 1897), at his own expense. In this work, Schwantje meticulously argued against hunting by exposing the underlying psychological motive for it: the desire to kill, which he suggested is often unconscious. He coined the provocative term "lustmord" ("lust murder") to describe this hidden drive.

In 1898 he temporarily was a pupil of the painter Karl Wilhelm Diefenbach, who was a pioneer of the naturist movement and the peace movement. Therefore, he lived with the painter in his country commune called Himmelhof in Ober Sankt Veit near Vienna. At the beginning of the 20th century he worked for the Berliner Tierschutzverein (a society for the prevention of cruelty to animals in Berlin) and gathered experience, which was of great use for his later activities as speaker and author.

In 1907 he established his own animal rights organisation called Gesellschaft zur Förderung des Tierschutzes und verwandter Bestrebungen ("Society for the Promotion of Animal protection and Similar efforts"), which in 1919 was renamed Bund für radikale Ethik and persisted until 1933. Among the several hundred members were the politician and peace advocate Ludwig Quidde, his wife Margarethe Quidde and Hans Paasche.

Before World War I Schwantje already published a journal advocating the peace movement called Ethische Rundschau ("Ethical Review"). Furthermore, he was co-founder of the Bund der Kriegsdienstgegner ("Alliance of Enemies of Military Service") and wrote articles for the pacifistic journals Die Friedens-Warte ("The Peace-Lookout") and Friedensfront ("Peace-Front").

After the advent of Nazi Germany Schwantje's Bund für radikale Ethik was prohibited and he had to endure house searches in March 1933. Later that year in September he was arrested and interrogated in the Columbia concentration camp, a notorious prison of the Gestapo. His name was later withdrawn from the list of people, who were to be transported to the concentration camp in Dachau. In 1934 he emigrated to Switzerland and there supported the Zurich-based dentist Ludwig Fliegel in the work on his book against vivisection entitled 1000 Ärzte gegen die Vivisektion ("1000 doctors against vivisection"). Schwantje also wrote the preface for Fliegel's book, the distribution of which was subdued by the Nazis in Germany, but which was published in Switzerland in 1935.

After returning to Germany in 1949 he resumed his work as an activist for animal rights, vegetarianism and the peace movement. Until 1956 he lived with his sister Alwine Schütte in Stade, a city in Lower Saxony, and after her death moved to the Ruhr region.

=== Death ===
Schwantje died on 11 September 1959 in Oberhausen.

== Views ==
During World War I Schwantje developed a concept of radical ethics, which aims to address the root (therefore "radical") of all ills of societies. First and foremost this concept included as its most important component the protection of animal rights. In Schwantje's view, every being that is able to suffer is a legal entity, no matter what species it belongs to. A vegetarian diet, the abolition of vivisection and hunting were central claims of his idea of animal rights.

Schwantje himself practiced a strict vegetarian diet in a very devoted way, which today would be called veganism. The reasons Schwantje gave for his vegan lifestyle were primarily of ethical nature, whereas he rejected naturalistic arguments. He also repeatedly argued against prejudicating entire nations or other groups as for example tormentors of animals, as in the case of Spain (see for example bullfighting). He also vehemently rejected antisemitism, racism and racial hygiene, which was popular during his time.

Modern advocates of antispeciecism regard Schwantje as a predecessor. Author Matthias Rude writes in his book on the topic: "Schwantje entirely saw through the function of speciesistic ideology." In 1927 Schwantje spoke at the VII. Internationaler Demokratischer Friedens-Kongress ("7th international democratic peace-congress") in the bavarian city Würzburg and said: "For most people however, especially for meat-eaters, it's hard to judge animals in an unbiased manner, because they realize, that they must not exploit them as they do today, if they must acknowledge their higher mental qualities, especially an acute ability to suffer. Precisely because humans gain big profit through exploiting animals, they despise them. Today's contempt of animals has the same cause as the undervaluation of workers, of women, of Negroes and other oppressed and exploited human beings. Every time humans want to exploit other humans, they tend to suggest views about these humans, that facilitate the exploitation for them." (Translated from German, see the German article on Magnus Schwantje to read the original citation)

== Works ==
- Das »edle Waidwerk« und der Lustmord. 1897 ("The »noble Huntsmanship« and Sex Murder")
- Das Recht der Laien gegenüber den Ärzten. 1901 ("The Right of Laypersons As Against Doctors")
- Die Beziehungen der Tierschutzbewegung zu andern ethischen Bestrebungen. 1909 ("The Connections of the Animal Rights Movement to Other Ethical Endeavours")
- Tiermord und Menschenmord, Vegetarismus und Pazifismus 1916 (Reprint 2010, "Murder of Animals and Murder of Humans, Vegetarianism and Pacifism")
- Radikalismus und Idealismus. 1919 ("Radicalism and Idealism")
- Über Richard Wagners ethisches Wirken. 1919 ("About Richard Wagner's Ethical Activities")
- Schopenhauers Ansichten von der Tierseele und vom Tierschutz. 1919 ("Schopenhauer's Views of the Animal-soul and of Animal Protection")
- Gründe gegen die Vivisektion. 1919 ("Reasons Against Vivisection")
- Friedensheldentum. Pazifistische Aufsätze aus den Jahren 1914 und 1915. 1919 ("The Concept of the Peace-hero. Pacifistic Essays From the Years 1914 and 1915")
- Sollen wir jede sogenannte ehrliche Überzeugung achten? Eine Untersuchung der Einwirkung des unbewußten Willens auf die Urteilsbildung. 1920 ("Shall We Respect Every So Called Honest Belief? An Examination of the Impact of the Unconscious Will on the Creation of Judgements")
- Hans Paasche. Sein Leben und Wirken. 1921 ("Hans Paasche. His Life and Works")
- Das Recht zur Gewaltanwendung. 1922 ("The Right for the Use of Violence")
- Die Liebe zu den Tieren. 1923 ("The Love of Animals")
- Tierschlachtung und Krieg. 1928 ("Animal Slaughter and War")
- Ehrfurcht vor dem Leben, Brüderlichkeit und Vegetarismus. 1949 ("Reverence for Life, Brotherliness and Vegetarianism")
- Gegenseitige Hilfe und Kampf ums Dasein in der Tierwelt. 1952 ("Mutual Help and the Fight for Existence in the Animal World")

== Literature ==
- Leo Tolstoy, Clara Wichmann, Elisée Reclus, Magnus Schwantje u. a. – Das Schlachten beenden! Zur Kritik der Gewalt an Tieren. Anarchistische, feministische, pazifistische und linkssozialistische Traditionen. Verlag Graswurzelrevolution Heidelberg 2010, S. 97–119
- Magnus Ernst Schwantje gestorben, in: Mitteilungen des Stader Geschichts- und Heimatvereins, Jg. 38 (1963), S. 53–54.
- Käthe Moritz (Hrsg.): Magnus Schwantje – dem bahnbrechenden Vegetarierphilosophen und selten uneigennützigen Menschen zum Gedächtnis. Friedens-Verlag: Salzburg / Großgmain – Bad Reichhall o. J. [1959 ?]

== See also ==
- Albert Schweitzer, known for his Reverence for Life philosophy
