= Hans Paasche =

German politician and pacifist

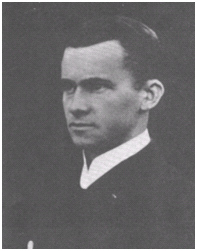
Hans Paasche.

Hans Paasche (3 April 1881 in Rostock – 21 May 1920 in Waldfrieden, Neumark) was a German politician and pacifist. He was the son of the Reichstag vice president Hermann Paasche and Lisi Paasche, and was married to Gabriele (Ellen) Witting.

Hans (Johannes) Albert Ferdinand Paasche studied at the Joachimsthalsches Gymnasium in Berlin. He became a sea cadet in 1899. An Imperial Navy officer and combative pacifist, Hans Paasche was also a big game hunter and nature conservationist, explorer of Africa and life reformer, alcohol abstainer and vegetarian, author and revolutionary. His brief but active life was marked by attempts to change the Prussian Deutschland-über-alles military mindset.

His first experience with war was at the German African military campaign in the German East Africa colonies, where he learned first hand the horror and futility of war. In 1905, Paasche became commander in chief in the Rufiji-region, now southern Tanzania. His command was decisive, but he also took pains to reach a swift pacification. Refugees and defeated Africans found medical help and shelter at his headquarters at Mtanza. He was decorated with the Order of the Crown with Swords, but was removed from command because of his independent peace negotiations. His experiences during the uprising and his guilty feelings over his actions changed his life forever. At a public meeting in Berlin in March 1913, Paasche said:

In East Africa I killed people in the course of a war, and I was even given a medal for doing so, thus I know what war really looks like. In those days, as a young officer, I was firmly convinced that by suppressing a native rebellion I was performing a great service to civilisation and to my Fatherland, and that I had to protect with armed force the European settlers and the natives who had not taken part in the rebellion. However as I have evolved, I find that the memory of the dreadful misery which I saw during the war weighs ever more heavily on my soul. This makes me think all the more about what can be done to avoid such misfortune.

After his return to Germany, in 1908 he married Ellen Witting, daughter of Richard Witting, director of the Nationalbank für Deutschland and former Lord Mayor of Posen (Poznań). His honeymoon trip brought him back to Africa, where he undertook a major expedition with his wife Ellen, who became the first European woman to reach the source of the Nile and the first to ascend Kilimanjaro, as well as the recently erupted volcano Nyiragongo.

Paasche published his first book: Im Morgenlicht ("In the Morning Light"), which contained impressions of war and of hunting in Africa, but also valuable ethnographical materials. Paasche's fictional series of letters Lukanga Mukara offer a look at Germany through the eyes of an educated African and mock the decadence of the early pre-World War I Germany. His satirical parody of German lifestyles and attitudes gained immediate popularity. Hans Paasche became one of the most charismatic public figures of the German Empire, well known for openly advocating his provocative ideas.

Still in uniform but not on active duty, he undertook an assault on the many wrongs that he saw in the German society and its military obsessions. This brought him many avid listeners and readers, especially among the young. It also brought him vilification, including that of his own father, and the dangerous attention of military prosecutors.

A high treason prosecution was conducted against him by Abteilung IIIb, the intelligence service of the General Staff led by colonel Walter Nicolai. The trial ended in 1918 with a negotiated admission into a mental health institution. He was released at the end of 1918, and continued his work as a radical journalist. He served a brief term in the Berlin Workers' and Soldiers' Council and tried in vain to organize a national court. Eventually he was forced out by right-wing social democrats.

After the sudden death of his wife Ellen at twenty nine, he retreated to his estate at Waldfrieden to take care of his four young children, Jochen, Nils, Helga and Ivan. Nevertheless, he still took part in national and international campaigns for peace, understanding among nations, and a League of Nations. His estate Waldfrieden became a shelter for hunted leftist insurgents.

His assassination was ultimately decreed by the ultra-nationalist death squad Organisation Consul. In 1920, at the age of 39, he was shot by a commando of sixty soldiers from District Command III while supposedly trying to escape. The soldiers had mounted the operation under an anonymous call with the pretense of finding a hidden weapons cache, which was never found. Few were prosecuted and none were convicted.

In 1985, Helga Paasche removed the tombstone of her father from Waldfrieden to the archives of the German Youth Movement on Ludwigstein Castle, where it is part of a permanent Hans-Paasche-exhibition.

His life has been extensively documented by his daughter, Helga Paasche, the author Werner Lange and his grandson Dr. Gottfried Paasche (for many years a professor of sociology at Canada's York University), among others. Hans Paasche's great-granddaughter, Sarah Paasche-Orlow, is a Conservative Rabbi.

== Bibliography ==
- Im Morgenlicht. Kriegs-, Jagd- und Reise-Erlebnisse in Ostafrika (Berlin: C.A. Schwetschke, 1907). English translation: In the Morning Light: The Memoirs of a German Naval Officer in the Rufiji Valley of Tanzania during the Maji Maji Rebellion, 1905-06 (2022).
- Die Forschungsreise des Afrikaners Lukanga Mukara ins innerste Deutschland 1912/1913
- Fremdenlegionär Kirsch - Eine abenteuerliche Fahrt von Kamerun in die deutschen Schützengräben in den Kriegsjahren 1914/15 1914
- Hans Paasche: Militant Pacifist in Imperial Germany, by Werner Lange, translated by David Koblick 2005
- Magnus Schwantje: "Hans Paasche. Sein Leben und Wirken" (= Flugschriften des Bundes Neues Vaterland, Nr. 26/27) Berlin 1921
- Otto Wanderer (d.i. Otto Buchinger): Paasche-Buch Hamburg 1921
- Franziskus Hähnel: Erinnerungen an Hans Paasche. In: Junge Menschen, 3. Jg., Heft 11/12* Juni 1922
- Helmut Donat, Wilfried Knauer (Ê.): "„Auf der Flucht“ erschossen. Schriften und Beiträge von und über Hans Paasche" (= Schriftenreihe Das Andere Deutschland, Nr. 1) Bremen/Zeven 1981
- Reinhold Lütgemeier-Davin: "Hans Paasche (1881–1920), Lebensreformer, Anti-Preuße, Revolutionär". In: Jahrbuch des Archivs der deutschen Jugendbewegung Bd. 13, Burg Ludwigstein 1981
- Helga Paasche: "Ein Leben für unsere Zukunft. Hans Paasche zum 65. Todestag". In: Jahrbuch des Archivs der deutschen Jugendbewegung Bd. 15, Burg Ludwigstein 1984-85
- Peter Morris-Keitel: Umwertung aller Werte. Hans Paasches
- Horst Naumann: "Hans Paasche. Pazifist - Revolutionär - Kommunist". In: Die Novemberrevolution und die Gründung der KPD. Protokoll der wissenschaftlichen Konferenz …, Teil 1 Berlin 1989
- Hans Paasche (E. Helmut Donad, Helga Paasche): "Ändert Euren Sinn! Schriften eines Revolutionärs" (= Schriftenreihe Geschichte und Frieden, Bd. 2) Bremen 1992
- Karl H. Solbach: "Hans Paasche - Offizier, Reformer, Revolutionär". In: CorneliusO Neutsch, Karl H. Solbach (E.), Reise in die Kaiserzeit. Ein deutsches Kaleidoskop Leipzig 1994
- Alan Nothnagle: "Metanoia! Hans Paasche - ein lebensreformerischer Visionär". In: Zeitschrift für Geschichtswissenschaft, 45. Jg., Nr. 9 Berlin 1997
- Gottfried Paasche, Joaquim Kuhn (E.): The Strange Story of the Shooting of Captain Hans Paasche. The Writings and Actions of a Peace Martyr Toronto 2001
- Jerzy Giergielewicz: "Hans Paasche: fascynujaca postac Niemca, w Polsce prawie nie znana". In: Wedrowiec Zachodniopomorski, 10. Jg., Nr. 2 Szczecin 2003
- Hans Paasche, P. Werner Lange: "Die Legende von der Vertreibung der Kaiserin oder Potsdamer Beiträge zum deutsch-polnischen Jahr". In: Schriftzüge. Brandenburgische Blätter für Kunst und Literatur, 7. Jg., Nr.1 Potsdam 2005
- P. Werner Lange: "Die Toten im Maisfeld. Hans Paasches Erkenntnisse aus dem Maji-Maji-Krieg". In: Felicitas Becker, Jigal Beez (E.), Der Maji-Maji-Krieg in Deutsch-Ostafrika, 1905-1907 Berlin 2005
- P. Werner Lange: "„Und ich zweifelte, ob ich ein Krieger sei …” Der Kolonialoffizier und Pazifist Hans Paasche". In: Ulrich Van Der Heyden, Joachim Zeller (E.), Macht und Anteil an der Weltherrschaft. Berlin und der deutsche Kolonialismus Münster 2005
- P. Werner Lange: "Die Treppe zum Himmel. Zur Eröffnung einer Gedenkstätte für Hans Paasche in der Wojewodschaft Wielkopolska". In: Inter Finitimos. Jahrbuch zur deutsch-polnischen Beziehungsgeschichte 3 Osnabrück 2006
- Andreas Schmid: "Deutschland im Spiegel Ostafrikas. Hans Paasches Lukanga Mukara (1912/13)". In: Zeitschrift für Kulturwissenschaften, 14. Jg., Nr. 2, 2020, 49–66.
- Paasche, Karin Ilona (2015). "Germany's Africa: A Literary and Historical Disconnect". Procedia – Social and Behavioral Sciences. The Proceedings of 2nd Global Conference on Conference on Linguistics and Foreign Language Teaching. 192: 398–407. doi:10.1016/j.sbspro.2015.06.056.
- Mary Fulbrook, Dissonant Lives: Generations and Violence through the German Dictatorships (Oxford: Oxford University Press, 2011), chapter 2 and passim.
