= Price index =

Normalized average of price changes for goods and services

A price index (plural: "price indices" or "price indexes") is a normalized average (typically a weighted average) of price relatives for a given class of goods or services in a specific region over a defined time period. It is a statistic designed to measure how these price relatives, as a whole, differ between time periods or geographical locations, often expressed relative to a base period set at 100.

Price indices serve multiple purposes. Broad indices, like the Consumer price index, reflect the economy’s general price level or cost of living, while narrower ones, such as the Producer price index, assist producers with pricing and business planning. They can also guide investment decisions by tracking price trends.

== Types of price indices ==
Some widely recognized price indices include:

- Consumer price index – Measures retail price changes for consumer goods and services.
- Producer price index – Tracks wholesale price changes for producers.
- Wholesale price index – Monitors price changes at the wholesale level (historical in some regions).
- Employment cost index – Gauges changes in labor costs.
- Export price index – Tracks export price trends.
- Import price index – Monitors import price changes.
- GDP deflator – Reflects price changes across all goods and services in GDP.

== History of early price indices ==
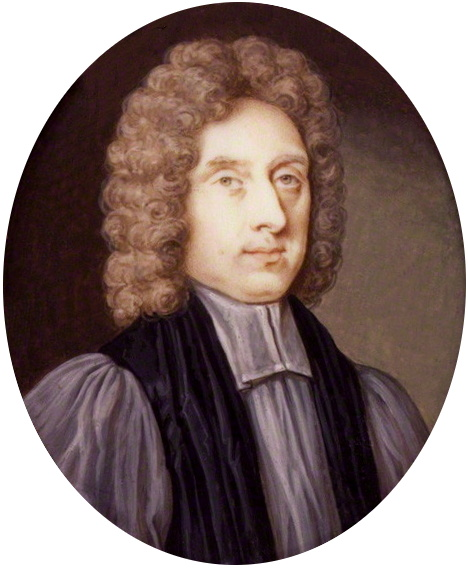
William Fleetwood

The origins of price indices are debated, with no clear consensus on their inventor. The earliest reported research in this area came from Rice Vaughan, who in his 1675 book A Discourse of Coin and Coinage analyzed price level changes in England. Vaughan sought to distinguish inflation from precious metals imported by Spain from the New World from effects of currency debasement. By comparing labor statutes from his era to those under Edward III (e.g., Statute of Labourers of 1351), he used wage levels as a proxy for a basket of goods, concluding prices had risen six- to eight-fold over a century. Though a pioneer, Vaughan did not actually compute an index.

In 1707, Englishman William Fleetwood developed perhaps the first true price index. Responding to an Oxford student facing loss of a fellowship due to a 15th-century income cap of five pounds, Fleetwood used historical price data to create an index of averaged price relatives. His work, published anonymously in Chronicon Preciosum, showed the value of five pounds had shifted significantly over 260 years.

== Basic formula ==
Price indices measure relative price changes using price ($p$) and quantity ($q$) data for a set of goods or services ($C$). The total market value in period $t$ is: :$\sum_{c \in C} (p_{c,t} \cdot q_{c,t})$ where $p_{c,t}$ is the price and $q_{c,t}$ the quantity of item $c$ in period $t$. If quantities remain constant across two periods ($q_{c,t_n} = q_{c,t_0} = q_c$), the price index simplifies to: :$P = \frac{\sum (p_{c,t_n} \cdot q_c)}{\sum (p_{c,t_0} \cdot q_c)}$ .

This ratio, weighted by quantities, compares prices between periods $t_0$ (base) and $t_n$. In practice, quantities vary, requiring more complex formulas.

== Price index formulas ==
Over 100 formulas exist for calculating price indices, aggregating price ($p_0, p_t$) and quantity ($q_0, q_t$) data differently. They typically use expenditures (price × quantity) or weighted averages of price relatives ($p_t / p_0$) to track relative price changes. Categories include unilateral (single-period weights), bilateral (two-period weights), and unweighted indices, with modern applications favoring Laspeyres for simplicity and superlative indices like Fisher for accuracy in GDP and inflation metrics.

=== Unilateral indices ===
These indices use weights—either fixed physical quantities or expenditure shares—drawn from a single reference period (base $t_0$ or current $t_n$). While arithmetic versions assume fixed baskets and do not account for substitution, geometric versions implicitly allow for unitary elasticity of substitution ($\sigma = 1$).

==== Laspeyres index ====
Developed in 1871 by Étienne Laspeyres, it uses base-period quantities:

$$P_L = \frac{\sum (p_{c,t_n} \cdot q_{c,t_0})}{\sum (p_{c,t_0} \cdot q_{c,t_0})}$$

It measures the cost of a fixed $t_0$ basket at new prices. This often overstates inflation because it does not account for consumers reacting to price changes by altering quantities purchased (e.g., substituting cheaper goods when prices rise). For example, when applied to an individual consumer’s bundle, a Laspeyres index of 1 means the consumer can afford to buy the same bundle in the current period as consumed in the base period, assuming income hasn’t changed.

==== Paasche index ====
Introduced in 1874 by Hermann Paasche, it uses current-period quantities:

$$P_P = \frac{\sum (p_{c,t_n} \cdot q_{c,t_n})}{\sum (p_{c,t_0} \cdot q_{c,t_n})}$$

It understates inflation by assuming consumers instantly adjust to new quantities, ignoring that higher prices might reduce demand over time. For example, a Paasche index of 1 indicates the consumer could have consumed the same bundle in the base period as in the current period, given unchanged income.

==== Lowe index ====
Named after Joseph Lowe, this uses fixed quantity weights from an expenditure base period ($b$), typically earlier than both the base ($t_0$) and current ($t_n$) periods, where the principal modification is to draw quantity weights less frequently than every period:

$$P_{Lo} = \frac{\sum p_{c,t_n} q_{c,b}}{\sum p_{c,t_0} q_{c,b}}$$

Unlike Laspeyres or Paasche, which draw weights from indexed periods, Lowe indices inherit weights from surveys (e.g., household budgets), often conducted every few years, while prices are tracked each period. For a consumer price index, these weights on various expenditures are typically derived from household budget surveys, which occur less often than price data collection. Used in most CPIs (e.g., Statistics Canada, U.S. Bureau of Labor Statistics), it’s a "modified Laspeyres" where Laspeyres and Paasche are special cases if weights update every period. The Geary-Khamis method, used in the World Bank’s International Comparison Program, fixes prices (e.g., group averages) while updating quantities.

==== Geometric Laspeyres index ====
Weighted by base-period expenditure shares:

$$P_{GM} = \prod_{i=1}^{n} \left(\frac{p_{i,t}}{p_{i,0}}\right)^{\frac{p_{i,0} \cdot q_{i,0}}{\sum (p_{0} \cdot q_{0})}}$$

A geometric mean of price relatives, it weights by economic importance, offering stability over arithmetic means like Laspeyres, but it’s fixed to base-period behavior.

=== Bilateral indices ===
These indices compare two periods or locations using prices and quantities from both, aiming to reduce bias from the single-period weighting of unilateral indices. They incorporate substitution effects by blending data symmetrically or averaging across periods, unlike unilateral indices that fix quantities and miss consumer adjustments.

==== Marshall-Edgeworth index ====
Credited to Alfred Marshall (1887) and Francis Ysidro Edgeworth (1925), it averages quantities:

$$P_{ME} = \frac{\sum [p_{c,t_n} \cdot (q_{c,t_0} + q_{c,t_n})]}{\sum [p_{c,t_0} \cdot (q_{c,t_0} + q_{c,t_n})]}$$

It uses a simple arithmetic mean of base and current quantities, making it symmetric and intuitive. However, its use can be problematic when comparing entities of vastly different scales (e.g., a large country’s quantities overshadowing a small one’s in international comparisons).

==== Superlative indices ====
Introduced by W. Erwin Diewert in 1976, superlative indices are a subset of bilateral indices defined by their ability to exactly match flexible economic functions (e.g., cost-of-living or production indices) with second-order accuracy, unlike the Marshall-Edgeworth index, which uses a basic arithmetic average lacking such precision. They adjust for substitution symmetrically, making them preferred for inflation and GDP measurement over simpler bilateral or unilateral indices.

===== Fisher index =====
Named for Irving Fisher, it’s the geometric mean of Laspeyres and Paasche:

$$P_F = \sqrt{P_L \cdot P_P}$$

It balances Laspeyres’ base-period bias (overstating inflation) and Paasche’s current-period bias (understating it), offering greater accuracy than Marshall-Edgeworth’s arithmetic approach. It requires data from both periods, unlike unilateral indices, and in chaining, it multiplies geometric means of consecutive period-to-period indices.

===== Törnqvist index =====
A geometric mean weighted by average value shares:

$$P_{T} = \prod_{i=1}^{n} \left(\frac{p_{i,t}}{p_{i,0}}\right)^{\frac{1}{2} \left[\frac{p_{i,0} \cdot q_{i,0}}{\sum (p_{0} \cdot q_{0})} + \frac{p_{i,t} \cdot q_{i,t}}{\sum (p_{t} \cdot q_{t})}\right]}$$

It weights price relatives by economic importance (average expenditure shares), providing precision over Marshall-Edgeworth’s simpler averaging, but it’s data-intensive, needing detailed expenditure data.

===== Walsh index =====
Uses geometric quantity averages:

$$P_{W} = \frac{\sum (p_{t} \cdot \sqrt{q_{0} \cdot q_{t}})}{\sum (p_{0} \cdot \sqrt{q_{0} \cdot q_{t}})}$$

It reduces bias from period-specific weighting with geometric averaging, outperforming Marshall-Edgeworth’s arithmetic mean in theoretical alignment, though it shares superlative data demands.

=== Unweighted indices ===
These compare prices of single goods between periods without quantity or expenditure weights, often as building blocks for indices like Laspeyres or Paasche within broader measures like CPI or PPI. For example, a Carli index of bread prices might feed into a Laspeyres index for a food category. They are called "elementary" because they’re applied at lower aggregation levels (e.g., a specific brand of peas), assuming prices alone capture consistent quality and economic importance—a simplification that fails if quality changes (e.g., better peas) or substitutes shift demand, unlike weighted indices (e.g., Fisher) that adjust via quantity or expenditure data.

==== Carli index ====
From Gian Rinaldo Carli (1764), an arithmetic mean of price relatives over a set of goods $C$:

$$P_{C} = \frac{1}{n} \cdot \sum_{c \in C} \frac{p_{c,t}}{p_{c,0}}$$

Simple and intuitive, it overweights large price increases, causing upward bias. Used in part in the British retail price index, it can record inflation even when prices are stable overall because it averages price ratios directly—e.g., a 100% increase (2) and a 50% decrease (0.5) yield 1.25, not 1.

==== Dutot index ====
By Nicolas Dutot (1738), a ratio of average prices:

$$P_{D} = \frac{\sum p_{t}}{\sum p_{0}}$$

Easy to compute, it’s sensitive to price scale (e.g., high-priced items dominate) and assumes equal item importance.

==== Jevons index ====
By William Stanley Jevons(1863), a geometric mean:

$$P_{J} = \left(\prod \frac{p_{t}}{p_{0}}\right)^{1/n}$$

It’s the unweighted geometric mean of price relatives. It was used in an early Financial Times index (the predecessor of the FTSE 100 Index), but it was inadequate for that purpose because if any price falls to zero, the index drops to zero (e.g., one free item nullifies the cost). That is an extreme case; in general, the formula will understate the total cost of a basket of goods (or any subset) unless their prices all change at the same rate. Also, as the index is unweighted, large price changes in selected constituents can transmit to the index to an extent not representing their importance in the average portfolio.

==== Harmonic mean indices ====
Related unweighted indices include the harmonic mean of price relatives (Jevons 1865, Coggeshall 1887):

$$P_{HR} = \frac{1}{\frac{1}{n} \cdot \sum \frac{p_{0}}{p_{t}}}$$

and the ratio of harmonic means:

$$P_{RH} = \frac{\sum \frac{n}{p_{0}}}{\sum \frac{n}{p_{t}}}$$

These dampen large price drops, offering stability but less economic grounding than weighted indices.

==== CSWD index ====
Named for Carruthers, Sellwood, Ward, and Dalén, a geometric mean of Carli and harmonic indices:

$$P_{CSWD} = \sqrt{P_{C} \cdot P_{HR}}$$

In 1922 Fisher wrote that this and the Jevons were the two best unweighted indexes based on Fisher’s test approach to index number theory, balancing Carli’s bias with harmonic stability, though it lacks economic weighting.

== Dynamic Equilibrium Price Index (DEPI) ==
The Dynamic Equilibrium Price Index (DEPI) is a theoretical concept and a type of price index that measures the ex ante intertemporal cost of living by incorporating both consumer prices and asset prices. The index is constructed by allocating weights to the Consumer Price Index (CPI) and asset prices through a parameter determined by time preference and the length of the planning horizon for living costs. When this parameter equals 1, the DEPI reduces to the CPI. In other words, DEPI is a universal price index, with the CPI being a special case of it.

$$DEPI = \left(\frac{P_\mathrm{T}}{P_\mathrm{0}}\right)^\alpha \times \left(\frac{Q_\mathrm{T}}{Q_\mathrm{0}}\right)^\beta$$

where $\beta=1-\alpha$

== Calculation methods ==
=== Normalization ===
Indices are often normalized so the base period equals 100, with later values as percentages. For example, if 2010 = 100 and prices rise 5% by 2011, the index is 105, showing a 5% increase.

=== Chained vs. unchained calculations ===
Unchained indices compare all periods to a fixed base (e.g., 2010), amplifying bias over time as quantities diverge. Chained indices update the base each period, calculating period-to-period changes (e.g., 2010 to 2011, 2011 to 2012) and multiplying them:

$$P_{t_n} = \prod_{i=1}^{n} \frac{\sum (p_{c,t_i} \cdot q_{c,t_{i-1}})}{\sum (p_{c,t_{i-1}} \cdot q_{c,t_{i-1}})}$$

Chaining reduces bias (e.g., reflecting recent substitution) but requires more data and can drift if errors accumulate.

=== Relative ease of calculating the Laspeyres index ===
The Laspeyres index is simpler to compute than Paasche or bilateral indices because it fixes quantities at $t_0$, requiring only price updates (e.g., monthly price surveys) without new quantity or expenditure data each period. Paasche needs current quantities, and superlatives like Fisher demand both, increasing data and computational demands.

=== Calculating indices from expenditure data ===
Sometimes, especially for aggregate data, expenditure data ($E_{c,t} = p_{c,t} \cdot q_{c,t}$) are more readily available than quantity data. If expenditure and base prices are known, indices can be computed without direct quantities. For example, Laspeyres becomes:

$$P_L = \frac{\sum (\frac{p_{c,t_n}}{p_{c,t_0}} \cdot E_{c,t_0})}{\sum E_{c,t_0}}$$

This uses expenditure shares and price relatives, a practical approach when quantities are hard to measure, though it retains Laspeyres’ fixed-weight assumptions.

== Theoretical evaluation ==
Price index formulas can be evaluated based on their relation to economic concepts (like cost of living) or on their mathematical properties. Several different tests of such properties have been proposed in index number theory literature, and W. Erwin Diewert summarized past research in a list of nine such tests:

1. Identity test:
  $$I(p_{t_m},p_{t_n},\alpha \cdot q_{t_m},\beta\cdot q_{t_n})=1~~\forall (\alpha ,\beta )\in (0,\infty )^2$$
  If prices remain the same between periods and quantities are scaled proportionally (each quantity of an item is multiplied by the same factor of either $\alpha$, for the first period, or $\beta$, for the later period), then the index should be 1.
2. Proportionality test:
  $$I(p_{t_m},\alpha \cdot p_{t_n},q_{t_m},q_{t_n})=\alpha \cdot I(p_{t_m},p_{t_n},q_{t_m},q_{t_n})$$
  If each price in the later period increases by a factor $\alpha$, then the index should increase by the factor $\alpha$.
3. Invariance to changes in scale test:
  $$I(\alpha \cdot p_{t_m},\alpha \cdot p_{t_n},\beta \cdot q_{t_m}, \gamma \cdot q_{t_n})=I(p_{t_m},p_{t_n},q_{t_m},q_{t_n})~~\forall (\alpha,\beta,\gamma)\in(0,\infty )^3$$
  If prices in both periods are scaled by $\alpha$ and quantities by $\beta$ and $\gamma$, then the index should remain unchanged, meaning the magnitude of prices and quantities shouldn’t affect the result.
4. Commensurability test:
  If units of measurement change (e.g., from kg to lbs), then the index should not be affected.
5. Symmetric treatment of time:
  $$I(p_{t_n},p_{t_m},q_{t_n},q_{t_m})=\frac{1}{I(p_{t_m},p_{t_n},q_{t_m},q_{t_n})}$$
  If the order of time periods is reversed, then the index should be the reciprocal of the original.
6. Symmetric treatment of commodities:
  If the order of commodities is permuted, then the index should remain unchanged, ensuring all goods are treated equally.
7. Monotonicity test:
  $$I(p_{t_m},p_{t_n},q_{t_m},q_{t_n}) \le I(p_{t_m},p_{t_r},q_{t_m},q_{t_r})~~\Leftarrow~~p_{t_n} \le p_{t_r}$$
  If later prices in one period ($t_n$) are less than or equal to those in another ($t_r$), then the index for $t_n$ should be less than or equal to that for $t_r$.
8. Mean value test:
  The overall price relative implied by the index should lie between the smallest and largest price relatives for all commodities.
9. Circularity test:
  $$I(p_{t_m},p_{t_n},q_{t_m},q_{t_n}) \cdot I(p_{t_n},p_{t_r},q_{t_n},q_{t_r})=I(p_{t_m},p_{t_r},q_{t_m},q_{t_r})~~\Leftarrow~~t_m \le t_n \le t_r$$
  If three ordered periods are considered ($t_m$, $t_n$, $t_r$), then the product of the index from $t_m$ to $t_n$ and from $t_n$ to $t_r$ should equal the index from $t_m$ to $t_r$.

== Quality change ==
Price indices often capture changes in price and quantities for goods and services, but they often fail to account for variation in the quality of goods and services. This could be overcome if the principal method for relating price and quality, namely hedonic regression, could be reversed. Then quality change could be calculated from the price. Instead, statistical agencies generally use matched-model price indices, where one model of a particular good is priced at the same store at regular time intervals. The matched-model method becomes problematic when statistical agencies try to use this method on goods and services with rapid turnover in quality features. For instance, computers rapidly improve and a specific model may quickly become obsolete. Statisticians constructing matched-model price indices must decide how to compare the price of the obsolete item originally used in the index with the new and improved item that replaces it. Statistical agencies use several different methods to make such price comparisons.

The problem discussed above can be represented as attempting to bridge the gap between the price for the old item at time t, $P(M)_{t}$, with the price of the new item at the later time period, $P(N)_{t+1}$.

- The overlap method uses prices collected for both items in both time periods, t and t+1. The price relative ${P(N)_{t+1}}$/${P(N)_{t}}$ is used.
- The direct comparison method assumes that the difference in the price of the two items is not due to quality change, so the entire price difference is used in the index. $P(N)_{t+1}$/$P(M)_t$ is used as the price relative.
- The link-to-show-no-change assumes the opposite of the direct comparison method; it assumes that the entire difference between the two items is due to the change in quality. The price relative based on link-to-show-no-change is 1.
- The deletion method simply leaves the price relative for the changing item out of the price index. This is equivalent to using the average of other price relatives in the index as the price relative for the changing item. Similarly, class mean imputation uses the average price relative for items with similar characteristics (physical, geographic, economic, etc.) to M and N.

== See also ==
- Aggregation problem
- Inflation
- Chemical plant cost indexes
- GDP deflator
- Etienne Laspeyres
- Hermann Paasche
- Hedonic index
- Indexation
- Irving Fisher
- Real versus nominal value (economics)
- U.S. Import Price Index
- Volume index
- Vimes Boots Index (VBI) - a proposed measure to assess the disproportionate impact of inflation and supermarket pricing practices on the poor
