= Hermann Paasche =

German statistician and economist (1851–1925)

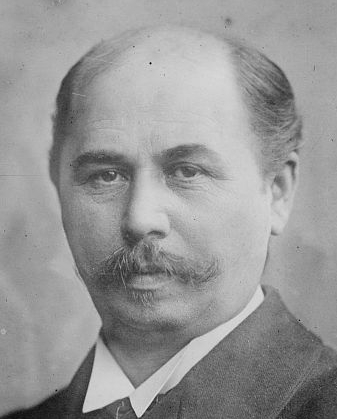
- Hermann Paasche (1851-1925)
- Born: February 24, 1851; Burg bei Magdeburg, Germany
- Died: April 11, 1925 (aged 74); Detroit, Michigan, US
- Education: University of Halle
- Known for: Paasche Index
- Scientific career
- Fields: Statistician and economist
- Workplaces: Aachen University of Technology; Universität Rostock; University of Marburg
- Doctoral advisor: Johannes Conrad
- Doctoral students: Karl Eugen Guthe

Notes
- He is the father of Hans Paasche.

Hermann Paasche (German pronunciation: [ˈpaːʃɛ]; February 24, 1851 – April 11, 1925) was a German statistician and economist. He is known for his Paasche Index, which provides a calculation of the Price Index. Paasche studied economics, agriculture, statistics and philosophy at University of Halle. In 1879, he became a professor of political science at Aachen University of Technology. Paasche died in 1925 in Detroit, Michigan, United States.

== Education ==
In 1870, Paasche matriculated from the Burg Gymnasium. At the University of Halle he first studied agriculture. After military service, his studies continued, however, his attention turned to economics, statistics, and philosophy. Paasche completed his doctorate in 1875 under Johannes Conrad at the University of Halle. In 1877, his postdoctoral thesis (habilitation) was entitled: Über die Entwicklung der Preise und der Rente des Immobiliarbesitzes.

== Career ==
His inaugural lecture was entitled: Über den Staat und seine volkswirtschaftlichen Aufgaben (About the state and its economic tasks). In 1879, he became professor of political science at Aachen University of Technology, but moved quickly to Universität Rostock, 1884 at the University of Marburg and 1897 to the Technische Hochschule in Charlottenburg (today, Technische Universität Berlin). Paasche developed a national statistical index (Paasche index) and analyzed the German sugar industry.

== Politics ==
In 1906, he gave up his professorship to devote his time to politics. As early as 1881 to 1884 Paasche was a Liberal Union Reichstag Member for Rostock. From 1893 he was involved in both the Reichstag, as well as the Prussian State Parliament. Paasche played a central role in addressing the crisis of German sugar industry through a change of protectionist to market-consumerist policy. Since 1898, he was a member of the Central Board of the National Liberal Party, from 1903 to 1909 and from 1912 to 1918 Vice-President of the Reichstag. Paasche was very combative, as a liberal: in 1908, during the Daily Telegraph affair, he attacked the emperor, and temporarily lost the support of the party and was not reintroduced into the Prussian State Parliament. During the First World War, he spoke out against the unrestricted submarine warfare and supported a peace agreement. From 1921 to 1924 he was Reichstag Member for the German People's Party. Paasche died in 1925 in Detroit, Michigan, United States.

In a speech in front of the Reichstag in 1904, Paasche described the Herero people as "laboring animals".

== Hans Paasche ==
His son, Hans Paasche, was an officer in the Kolonialtruppe, which he left in 1909 to the youth movement. Hans was a radical reformer, pacifist and conservationist. A high treason process ended in 1918 with his admission into a mental health institution. He was released at the end of 1918, and continued as a radical journalist. In 1920, he was shot as an alleged communist conspirator.

== Books by Hermann Paasche ==
- Die Geldentwertung zu Halle a. S. in den letzten Decennien dieses Jahrhunderts. Plötz, Halle a.S. 1875
- Über die Entwicklung der Preise und der Rente des Immobiliarbesitzes zu Halle a. S.. Plötz, Halle a.S. 1877
- Wandlungen in der modernen Volkswirtschaft. Erhardt, Marburg 1890
- Zuckerindustrie und Zuckerhandel der Welt. Fischer, Jena 1891
- Kultur- und Reiseskizzen aus Nord- und Mittelamerika. Rathke, Magdeburg 1894
- Die Zuckerproduktion der Welt. Teubner, Leipzig 1905

== See also ==
- Étienne Laspeyres
