= Personal consumption expenditures price index =

US indicator of average prices increases

Personal Consumption Expenditures Price Index (PCEPI)
Fed Preferred U.S. Inflation Metric

Administration & Metadata
- Maintained By: Bureau of Economic Analysis (BEA)
- Frequency: Monthly (via Personal Income and Outlays report)
- Base Period: 2017 = 100
- First Tracked: 1959

Latest Data (July 2026)
- Headline Index Level: 131.659
- Headline Inflation (YoY): 3.7%
- Core Index Level: 130.658
- Core Inflation (YoY): 3.3% (Excludes food & energy)
- Monthly Change (MoM): +0.2% (Seasonally Adjusted)

Methodological Framework
- Formula Type: Fisher Price Index (Chain-type)
- Data Sources: Consumer Price Index (CPI), Producer Price Index (PPI), Census business surveys
- Scope Expansion: Captures expenses paid on behalf of consumers (e.g., employer-paid health insurance, Medicare/Medicaid)
- Substitution Bias: Accounts for real-time consumer shifting behavior (e.g., switching to chicken if beef prices jump)

Key Variances from CPI
- Weighting Method: Uses dynamic business-side expenditure data (updated monthly) vs. CPI's fixed consumer baskets
- Monetary Policy: Target indicator for the Federal Reserve's long-run 2.0% inflation mandate

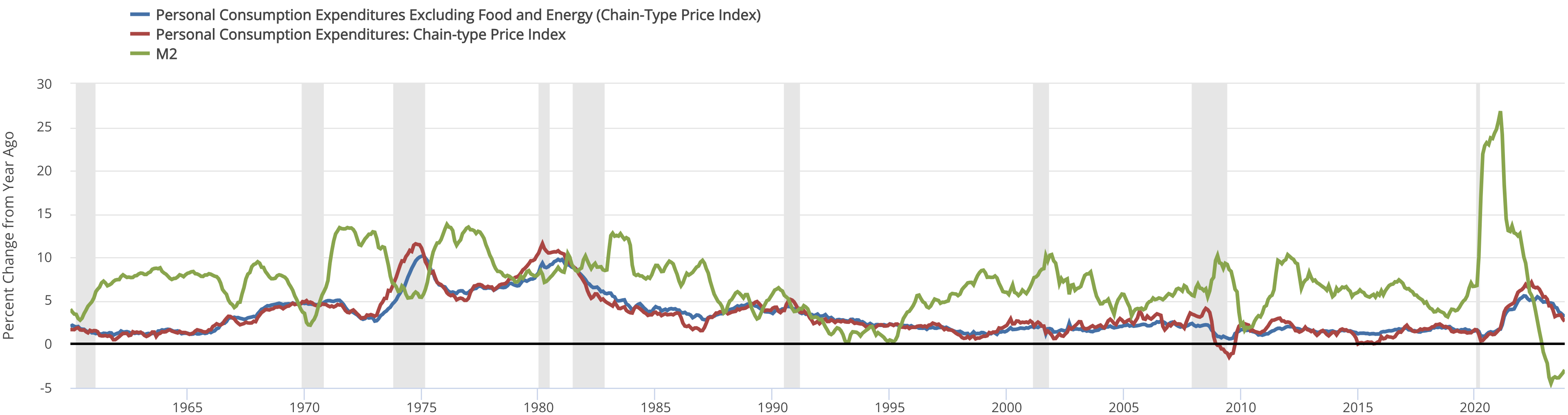
(Percent change from a year earlier) PCE Core PCE M2 money supply

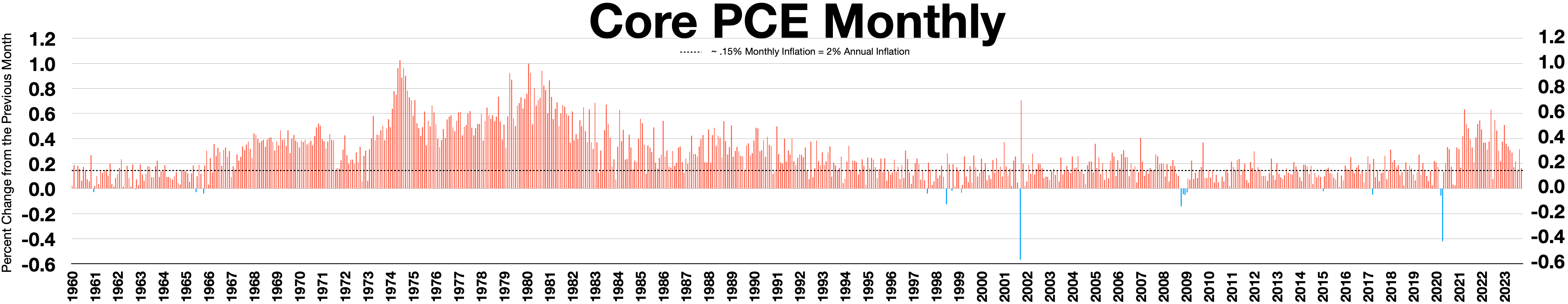
Core PCE Monthly ~ .15% monthly inflation is the 2% annual inflation target

The PCE price index (PCEPI), also referred to as the PCE deflator, PCE price deflator, or the Implicit Price Deflator for Personal Consumption Expenditures (IPD for PCE) by the Bureau of Economic Analysis (BEA) and as the Chain-type Price Index for Personal Consumption Expenditures (CTPIPCE) by the Federal Open Market Committee (FOMC), is a United States-wide indicator of the average increase in prices for all domestic personal consumption. It is currently benchmarked to a base of 2017, consistent with the US National Accounts. Using a variety of data including U.S. Consumer Price Index and Producer Price Index prices, it is derived from the largest component of the GDP in the BEA's National Income and Product Accounts, personal consumption expenditures. PCE data is published monthly by the Bureau of Economic Analysis (BEA) as part of the National Income and Product Accounts (NIPA).

The personal consumption expenditure (PCE) measure is the component statistic for consumption in gross domestic product (GDP) collected by the United States Bureau of Economic Analysis (BEA). It consists of the actual and imputed expenditures of households and includes data pertaining to durable and non-durable goods and services. Essentially, it is a measure of goods and services targeted towards individuals and consumed by individuals. The less volatile measure of the PCE price index is the core PCE (CPCE) price index, which excludes the more volatile and seasonal food and energy prices (e.g., oil, natural gas, and electricity).

PCE has been tracked since January 1959 and tended to record softer inflation readings than the CPI. This may be due to the failure of CPI to take into account the substitution effect. Alternatively, an unpublished report on this difference by the Bureau of Labor Statistics suggests that most of it is from different ways of calculating hospital expenses and airfares.

== Usage by the Federal Reserve ==
In its "Monetary Policy Report to the Congress" ("Humphrey–Hawkins Report") from February 17, 2000 the FOMC said it was changing its primary measure of inflation from the consumer price index to the "chain-type price index for personal consumption expenditures".

== Comparison to CPI ==
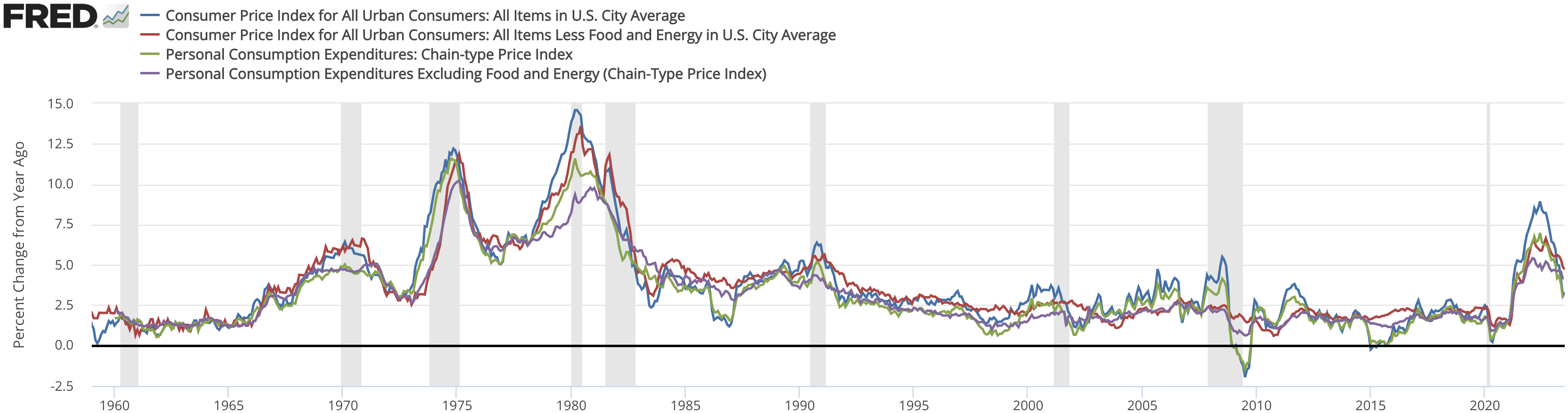
CPI Core CPI PCE Core PCE

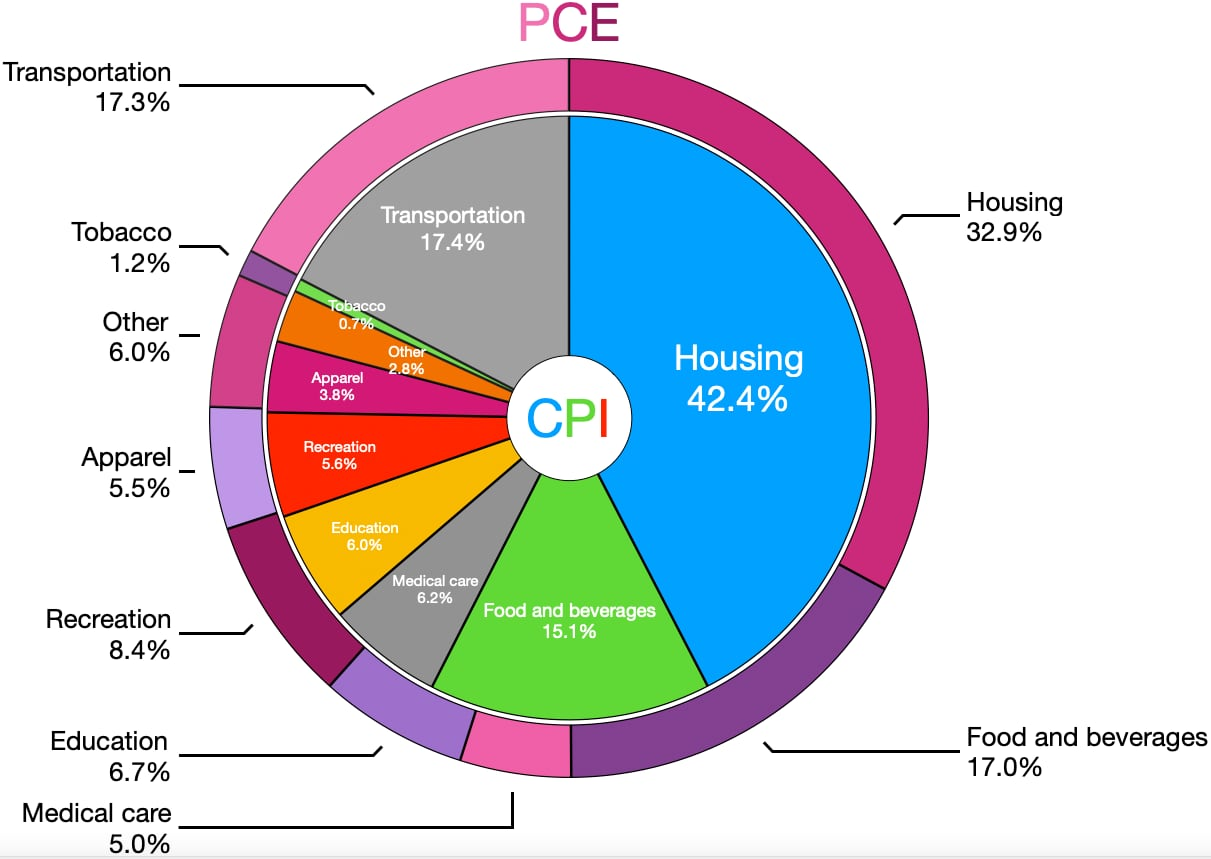
CPI vs PCE

In comparison to the headline United States Consumer Price Index (CPI), which uses one set of expenditure weights for one year (since 2023), this index uses a Fisher Price Index, which uses expenditure data from only the current period and the preceding period. Also, the PCEPI uses a chained index which compares one quarter's price to the previous quarter's instead of using a fixed base. This price index method assumes that the consumer has made allowances for changes in relative prices. That is to say, they have substituted from goods whose prices are rising to goods whose prices are stable or falling.

The differences between the two indexes can be grouped into four categories: formula effect, weight effect, scope effect, and "other effects".

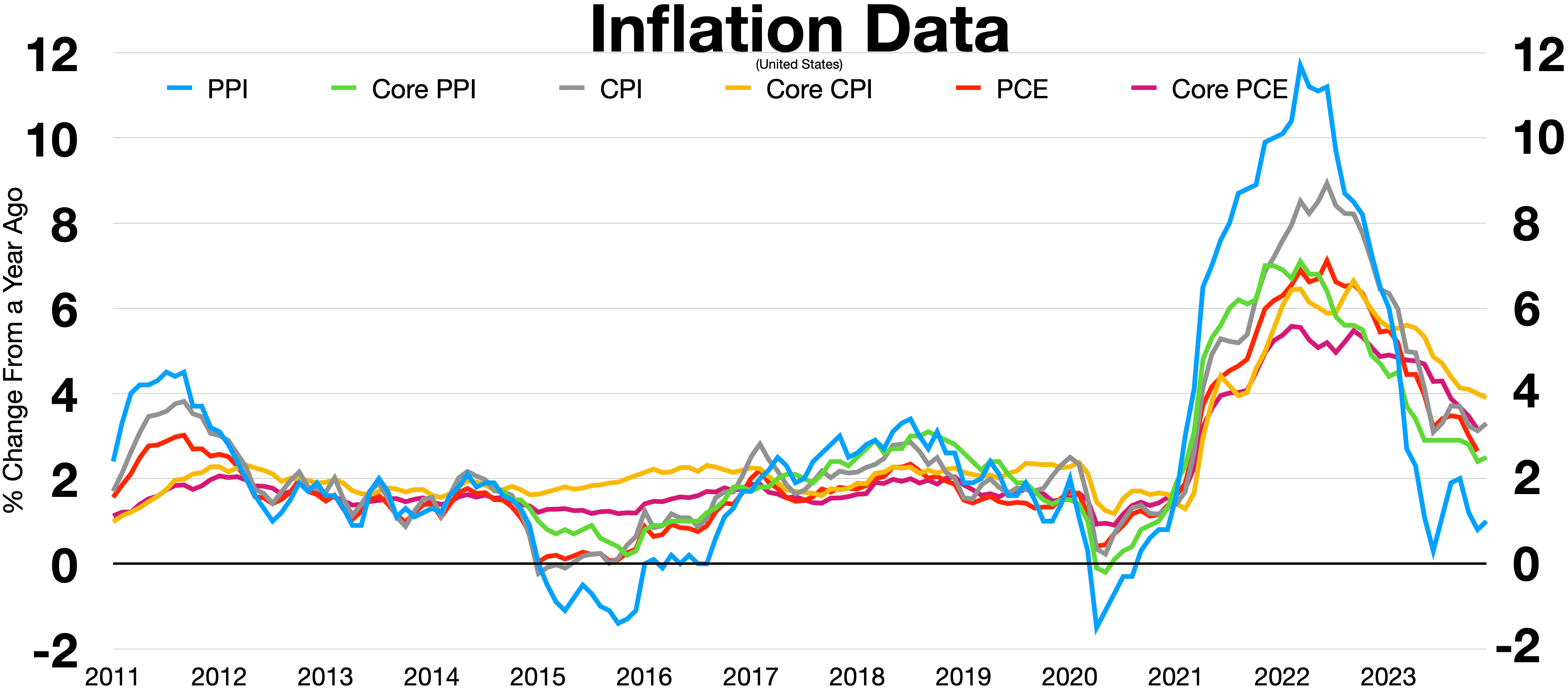
PPI is a leading indicator, CPI and PCE lag PPI Core PPI CPI Core CPI PCE Core PCE

- The formula effect accounts for the different formulas used to calculate the two indexes. The PCE price index is based on the Fisher-Ideal formula, while the CPI is based on a modified Laspeyres formula.
- The weight effect accounts for the relative importance of the underlying commodities reflected in the construction of the two indexes.
- The scope effect accounts for conceptual differences between the two indexes. PCE measures spending by and on behalf of the personal sector, which includes both households and nonprofit institutions serving households; the CPI measures out-of-pocket spending by households. The "net" scope effect adjusts for CPI items out-of-scope of the PCE price index less items in the PCE price index that are out-of-scope of the CPI.
- "Other effects" include seasonal adjustment differences, price differences, and residual differences.

- See more at: https://www.bea.gov/help/faq/555

Consumption category	CPI-U	PCE-UNADJ	PCE-ADJ
Food and beverages	15.1%	13.8%	17.0%
Food at home	8.0%	7.1%	8.7%
Food away from home	6.0%	4.9%	6.0%
Alcoholic beverages	1.1%	1.8%	2.3%
Housing	42.4%	26.5%	32.9%
Rent	5.8%	3.4%	4.1%
Owner's equivalent rent	23.4%	12.9%	15.9%
Other housing	13.1%	10.2%	12.9%
Apparel	3.8%	4.5%	5.5%
Medical care	6.2%	22.3%	5.0%
Transportation	17.4%	13.9%	17.3%
Motor vehicles	7.9%	5.3%	6.5%
Gasoline	4.2%	3.4%	4.3%
Other transportation	5.4%	5.2%	6.5%
Education and communication	6.0%	5.4%	6.7%
Recreation	5.6%	6.8%	8.4%
Tobacco	0.7%	1.0%	1.2%
Other goods and services	2.8%	5.8%	6.0%
	100%	100%	100%

Source: National Bureau of Economic Research

The above chart is illustrative but may not reflect current values. The comparisons in the table above will vary over time as the relative weights of the components of the indexes change. The CPI base price and weightings are adjusted every two years.

The above table illustrates two commonly discussed important differences between the PCE deflator and CPI-U. The first major difference is the relative importance of housing, which is due in part to the difference in scope mentioned above. CPI contains a large component of owner-equivalent rent, which by definition is an imputed value and not a real direct expenditure. The second major difference in weight is healthcare. This again stems from the definition of the index and the surveys used. CPI measures only the out-of-pocket healthcare costs of households, while PCE includes healthcare purchased on behalf of households by third parties, including employer-provided health insurance. In the United States, employer health insurance is a large component and accounts for much of the difference in weights.

Another notable difference is that prices and weightings of the CPI are based on household surveys, while those of the PCE are based on business surveys. One reason for the difference in formulas is that not all the data needed for the Fisher-Ideal formula is available monthly even though it is considered superior. CPI is a practical alternative used to give a quicker read on prices in the previous month. PCE is typically revised three times in each of the months following the end of a quarter, and then the entire NIPA tables are re-based annually and every five years. Despite all these conceptual and methodological differences, the two indexes track fairly closely when averaged over several years.

== See also ==
- Price index
- GDP deflator (IPD for GDP)
- Household final consumption expenditure (HFCE)
- Inflation
