= Producer price index =

Price index

Producer Price Index (PPI)
Key U.S. Wholesale Economic Indicator

Administration & Metadata
- Maintained By: Bureau of Labor Statistics (BLS)
- Frequency: Monthly
- Base Period: 1982 = 100
- Former Name: Wholesale Price Index (WPI) (Pre-1978)
- First Tracked: 1902

Latest Data (August 2026)
- Final Demand Level: 157.41
- Final Demand (YoY): 5.4%
- Core PPI (YoY): 4.6% (Excludes food & energy)
- Monthly Change (MoM): +0.4% (Seasonally Adjusted)

Structure & Calculation
- Target Universe: Output of entire domestic goods-producing sector (mining, manufacturing, agriculture) plus ~69% of service sector
- Sampling Size: Over 16,000 establishments providing ~64,000 price quotes monthly
- Exclusions: Imported goods, taxes, and distribution costs (wholesale/retail margins)
- Perspective: Measures revenue received by the seller, contrasting with the buyer-centric CPI

Classification Structures
- Core Analytical Frameworks: • Final Demand–Intermediate Demand (FD-ID): Organizes by type of buyer and stage of production flow.; • Commodity-based: Groups products and services by similarity of material or type, regardless of producing industry.; • Industry net-output: Measures price changes for the total output of specific NAICS industries.

Economic Relevance
- Leading Indicator: Anticipates consumer price shifts by tracking cost pass-through from manufacturers to retail baskets
- Business Use: Widely utilized in private commercial contracts for price escalation clauses

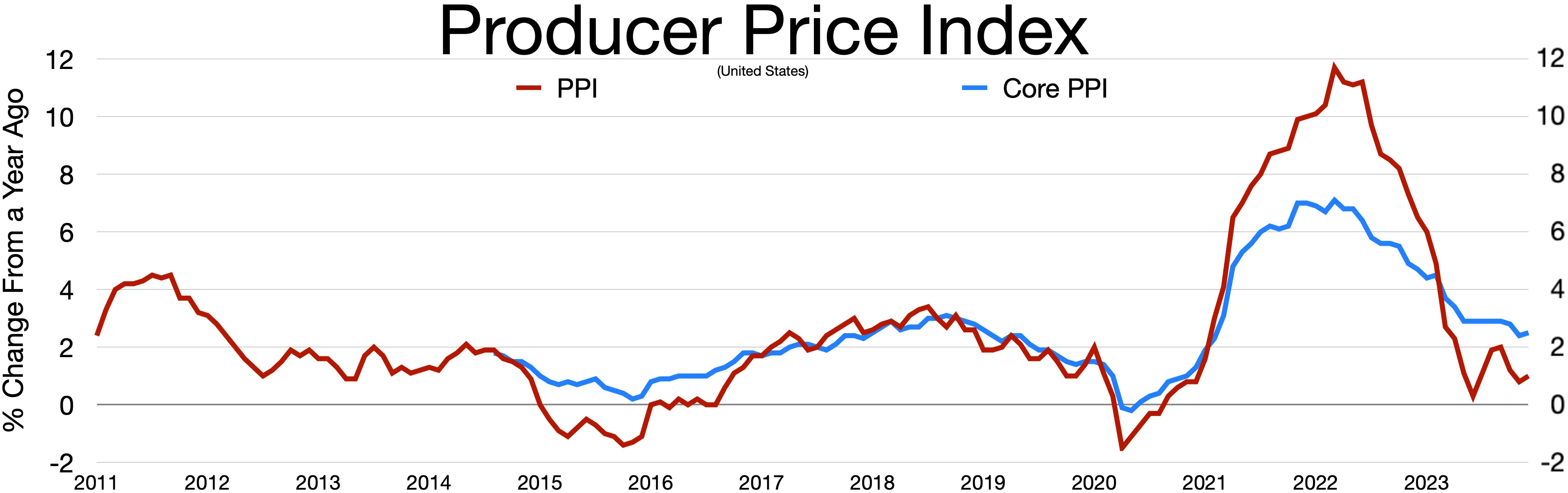
Producer Price Index PPI final demand Core PPI

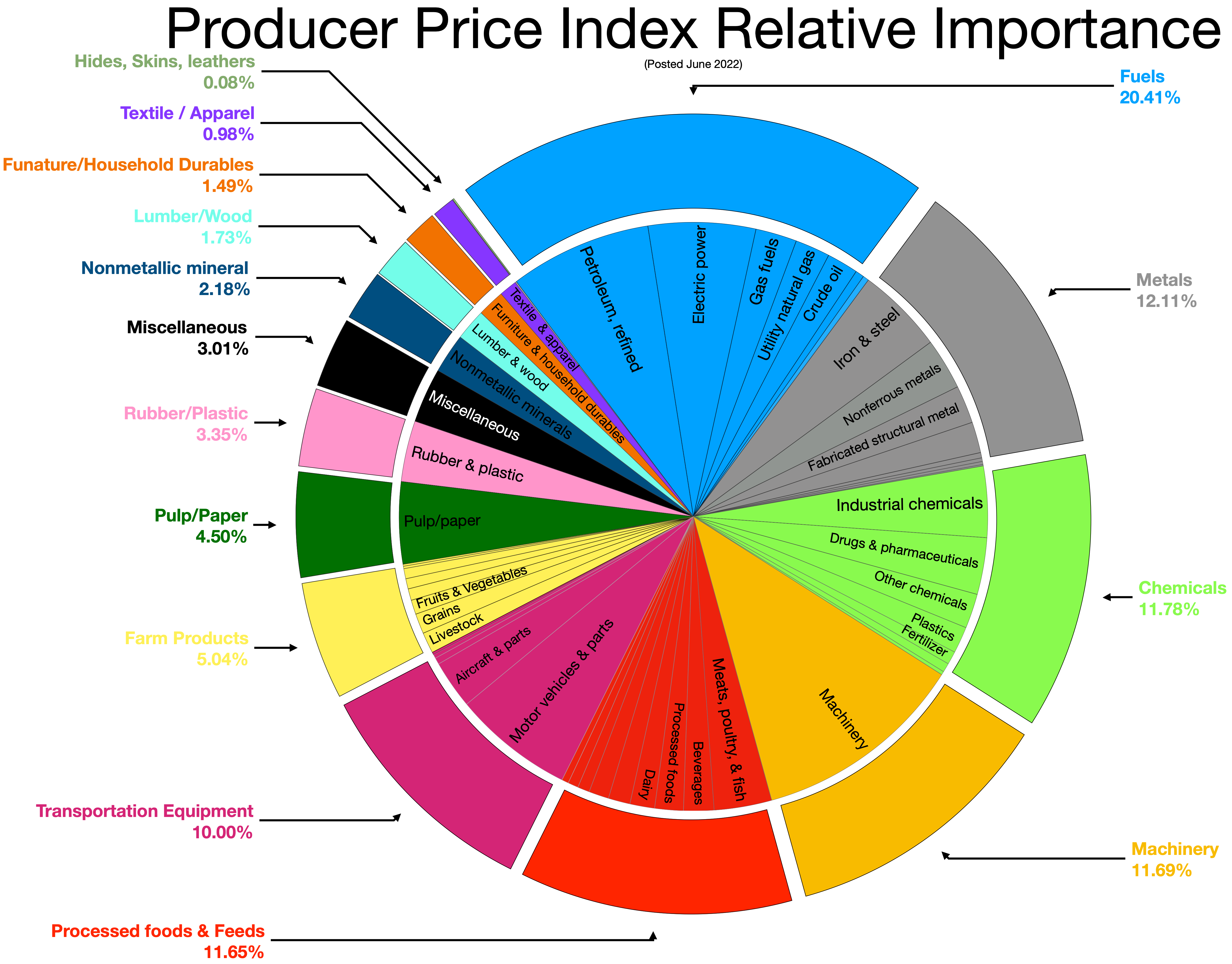
U.S. Producer Price Index Relative Importance for commodities Fuels Metals Chemicals Machinery Processed foods & feeds Transportation equipment Farm products Pulp / paper Rubber / plastic Miscellaneous Nonmetallic mineral Lumber / wood Furniture / household goods Textile / apparel Hides, skin, leathers

A producer price index (PPI) is a price index that measures the average changes in prices received by domestic producers for their output. Formerly known as the wholesale price index between 1902 and 1978, the index is made up of over 16,000 establishments providing approximately 64,000 price quotations that the U.S. Bureau of Labor Statistics (BLS) compiles each month to represent thousands of different goods and services.

Its importance is being reduced by the steady decline in manufactured goods as a share of spending. When manufacturers face increased production costs (input costs), businesses must reconsider their pricing approach by either:

1. Absorbing higher manufacturing costs, which may maintain customer satisfaction but can impact the company's profitability.
2. Transferring those costs to consumers, which may boost business profits, but means customers will face higher prices for the goods and services.

== Coverage ==
The PPI system encompasses the production of all industries in the sectors involved in manufacturing goods:

- Mining
- Manufacturing
- Agriculture
- Fishing
- Forestry
- Gas
- Electricity
- Waste
- Scrap materials

Imports are excluded, but locally produced goods that are transported between businesses owned by the same corporation are included. Items produced domestically specifically for the military are also included.

== Calculation ==
The PPI is determined by taking the average weighted price of goods and services produced in the U.S. for the current month and year, dividing it by the average weighted prices of goods and services produced in the U.S. during a base month and year, and then multiplying the outcome by 100.

The U.S. Bureau of Labor Statistics publishes three principal families of producer price indexes: industry net-output indexes, commodity indexes based on product similarity, and final-demand and intermediate-demand indexes that organize goods, services, and construction by the buyer and stage of production. Unlike the Consumer Price Index, which measures prices paid by consumers, the PPI measures prices received by domestic producers. Imports are excluded from the U.S. PPI.

== Related measures ==
A number of countries that now report a producer price index previously reported a wholesale price index.

== By country ==
=== United States ===
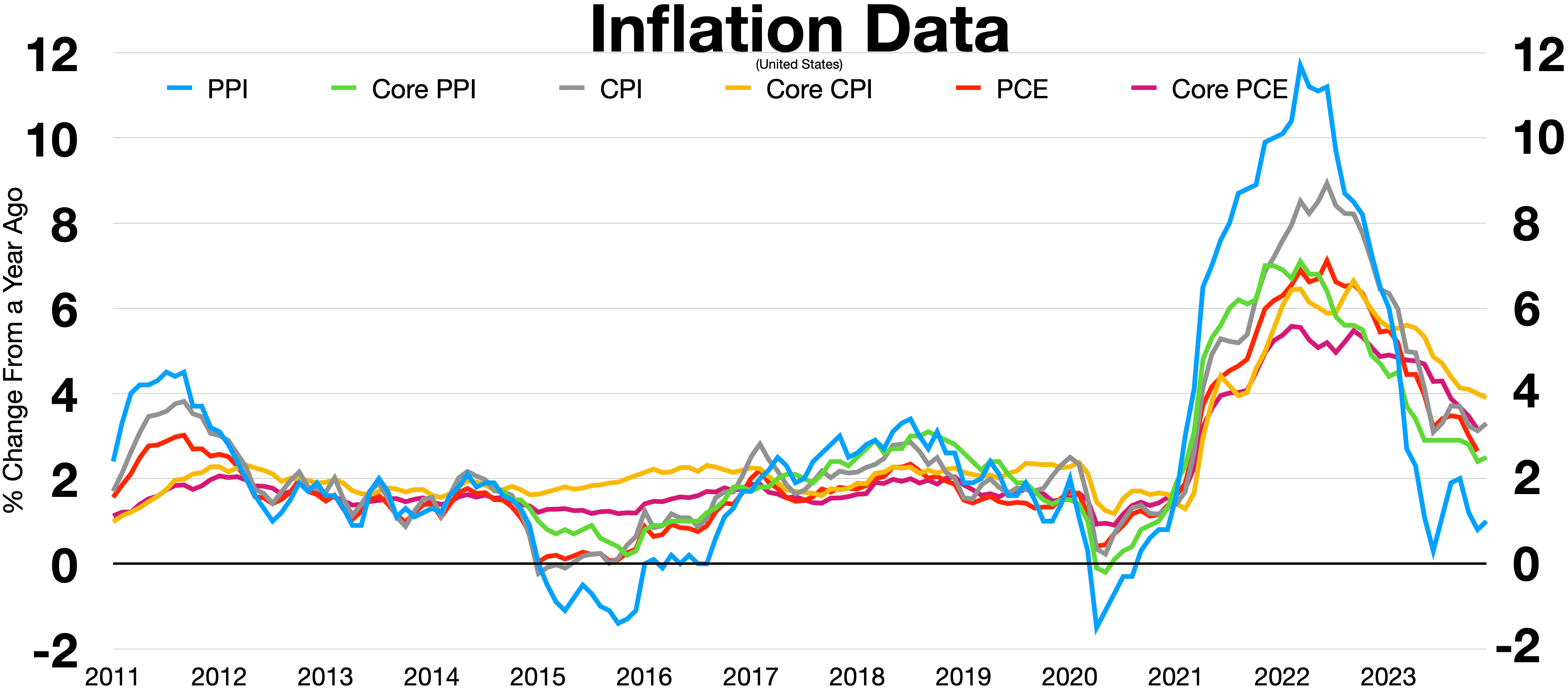
PPI is a leading indicator, CPI and PCE lag PPI Core PPI CPI Core CPI PCE Core PCE

In the US, the PPI was known as the wholesale price index, or WPI, up to 1978. The PPI is one of the oldest continuous systems of statistical data published by the Bureau of Labor Statistics, as well as one of the oldest economic time series compiled by the Federal Government. The origins of the index can be found in an 1891 U.S. Senate resolution authorizing the Senate Committee on Finance to investigate the effects of the tariff laws "upon the imports and exports, the growth, development, production, and prices of agricultural and manufactured articles at home and abroad".

In September 2026, U.S. producer prices rose 1.3% from August, marking the biggest monthly increase since March 2022. Compared with a year earlier, prices were up 6.3%, partly due to rising energy costs, according to the U.S. Bureau of Labor Statistics.

=== India ===
The Indian wholesale price index (WPI) was first published in 1902, and the country now uses CPI. No PPI is formulated in India.

== See also ==
- Consumer price index
- Inflation
- Substitute good
- 2000s commodities boom
- 2020s commodities boom
