= Étienne Laspeyres =

German economist

Ernst Louis Étienne Laspeyres
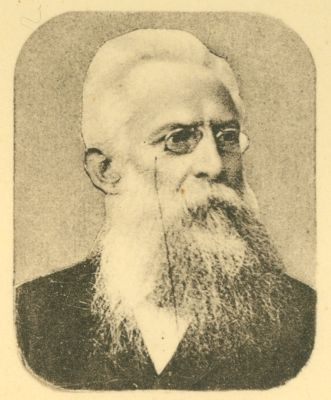
- Born: 28 November 1834; Halle an der Saale, German Confederation
- Died: 4 August 1913 (aged 78); Gießen, German Empire
- Scientific career
- Fields: Statistics, economics
- Institutions: University of Giessen

Ernst Louis Étienne Laspeyres (German: [lasˈpaɪrəs]; 28 November 1834 – 4 August 1913) was a German economist. He was Professor ordinarius of economics and statistics or State Sciences and cameralistics (public finance and administration) in Basel, Riga, Dorpat (now Tartu), Karlsruhe, and finally for 26 years in Gießen. Laspeyres was the scion of a Huguenot family of originally Gascon descent which had settled in Berlin in the 17th century, and he emphasised the Occitan pronunciation of his name as a link to his Gascon origins.

== Work ==
Laspeyres is mainly known today for his 1871 development of the index number formula method for determining price increases, used for calculating the rate of inflation. A type of this calculation is known today as the Laspeyres Index. In addition to his accomplishments in price indices, Laspeyres may be counted as one of the fathers of business administration as an academic-professional discipline in Germany, and as one of the main unifiers of economics and statistics by "developing ideas which are today by and large nationally and internationally reality: quantification and operationalization of economics; expansion of official statistics; cooperation of official statistics and economic research; and integration of the economist and the statistician in one person." (Rinne 1983) In economics, Laspeyres was to some extent a representative of the Historical School and certainly of Kathedersozialismus.

The surname Laspeyres is of Gascon origin; his ancestors were Huguenots who settled in Berlin in the 17th century. How he pronounced his surname is uncertain, but likely as "Las-pay-ress".

== Bibliography ==
Books by Laspeyres:

- Wechselbeziehungen zwischen Volksvermehrung und Höhe des Arbeitslohns, 1860
- Geschichte der Volkswirtschäftlichen Anschauungen der Niederländer und ihrer Literatur zur Zeit der Republik, 1863
- Der Einfluß der Wohnung auf die Sittlichkeit, 1869

Articles by Laspeyres:

- "Mitteilungen aus Pieter de la Courts Schriften. Ein Beitrag zur Geschichte der niederländischen Nationalökonomik des 17. Jahrhunderts" in Zeitschrift für die gesamte Staatswissenschaft, 1862
- "Hamburger Warenpreise 1851-1860 und die kalifornisch-australische Geldentdeckung seit 1848. Ein Beitrag zur Lehre von der Geldentwertung" in Jahrbücher für Nationalökonomie und Statistik, 1884
- "Die Berechnung einer mittleren Warenpreissteigerung" in Jahrbücher für Nationalökonomie und Statistik, 1871
- "Welche Waren werden im Verlaufe der Zeiten immer teurer? – Statistische Studien zur Geschichte der Preisen" in Zeitschrift für die gesamte Staatswissenschaft, 1872
- "Statistische Untersuchungungen über die wirtschaftliche und soziale Lage der sogenannte arbeitenden Klassen" in Concordia Zeitschrift für die Arbeiterfrage, 1875
- "Die Kathedersocialisten und die statistischen Congresse. Gedanken zur Begründung einer nationalökonomischen Statistik und einer statistischen Nationalökonomie" in Deutsche Zeit- und Streit-Fragen, 1875
- "Zur wirtschaftlichen Lage der ländlichen Arbeiter im deutschen Reich" in Zeitschrift für die gesamte Staatswissenschaft, 1876
- "Preise (Die Bewegungen der Warenpreise in der zweiten Hälfte des 19. Jahrhunderts)", voce nell'enciclopedia Meyers Konversations-Lexikon, 1883
- "Statistischen Untersuchungen zur Frage der Steuerüberwälzung" in Finanz-Archiv, 1901
- "Einzelpreise und Durchschnittspreise vegetalischer und animalischer Produkte in Preußen während der 75 Jahre 1821 bis 1895" in Zeitschrift, Prussia, Statistisches Bureau, 1901
