= Substitution bias =

Substitution bias describes a possible bias in economic index numbers if they do not incorporate data on consumer expenditures switching from relatively more expensive products to cheaper ones as prices changed.

Substitution bias occurs when prices for items change relative to one another. Consider how consumer expenditures are reflected in a consumer price index. Consumers will tend to buy more of the good whose price declined, and less of the now relatively more expensive good. This change in consumption may not be reflected in the longstanding market basket from which a consumer price index is constructed. If a selected good is bought by consumers and it is therefore included in the CPI basket, but when an increase in price of that selected good occurs customers may buy a cheaper substitute, while the CPI basket may not quickly capture this change. If product A is purchased by most consumers, and similar product B goes on sale making it cheaper, consumers will naturally buy what is cheaper.

Substitution bias can cause inflation rates to be over-estimated. Data collected for a price index, if from an earlier period, may poorly correspond to the prices and consumer-expenditure-shares going to goods whose prices later changed. To reduce this problem, several steps can be taken by makers of price indices:

- Collect price data and expenditure data frequently to capture recent changes, and incorporate both into the indices quickly
- Adopt superlative index formulae for price indices, usually Tornqvist indexes or Fisher indexes
- Use hedonic index methods to capture attributes of products and their implicit prices; see hedonic regression and the related index problem of quality bias.
