= Zvi Griliches =

Jewish American econometrician

- Born: 12 September 1930; Kaunas, Lithuania
- Died: 4 November 1999 (aged 69); Cambridge, Massachusetts, U.S.

Academic background
- Education: University of California, Berkeley (BS); University of Chicago (PhD)
- Influences: Arnold Harberger

Academic work
- Discipline: Economics
- Notable ideas: Theoretical and applied econometrics
- Awards: John Bates Clark Medal (1965)
- Scientific career
- Thesis: Hybrid corn: An exploration in economics of technological change (1957)
- Doctoral advisor: Theodore Schultz; Arnold Harberger
- Doctoral students: Yehuda Grunfeld; K. L. Krishna; G. S. Maddala; Robert Barro; Ariel Pakes; David Neumark; Eli Berman
- Website: Information at IDEAS / RePEc

Hirsh Zvi Griliches (/ˈɡrɪlɪkəs/ GRIL-i-kəs; 12 September 1930 – 4 November 1999) was a Lithuanian-born economist at Harvard University. Zvi Griliches's works concerned mostly the economics of technological change, including empirical studies of diffusion of innovations and the roles of R&D, patents, and education. In 2023, he had 126 publications listed in Web of Science and a Hirsch index of 49, which places him into 2% of the most productive economics professors in the United States.

== Biography ==
He was born in Kaunas, Lithuania, in an assimilated Ashkenazi Jewish family that spoke Russian at home. During World War II, he was sent to the Dachau concentration camp. In 1947, he emigrated to Palestine, where he served in the prestate Israeli army, learned Hebrew, passed a high school equivalency exam, and studied for a year at Hebrew University. He then moved to the United States, where he earned a B.S. in agricultural economics from the University of California, Berkeley and then a Ph.D. in economics from the University of Chicago, supervised by Theodore Schultz.

In his classic 1957 Ph.D. dissertation, Hybrid Corn: An Exploration in the Economics of Technological Change, published as an article in the October 1957 issue of Econometrica, Griliches demonstrated that the penetration of corn seeds followed the logistic curve. It was found later through multiple examples by Edwin Mansfield and other researchers that this is a general rule for technological change / diffusion of innovations. The dissertation was one of the first scientific works that treated the development of new technology as an economic phenomenon. Previously, economists had treated it as exogenous.

Most innovations either make production more efficient or improve the quality of goods. The analysis of measurement of the impacts of innovations on economics led Griliches to his fundamental studies of economic growth, productivity, production function, consumption function, measurements of economic input and output, hedonic prices, and their reflection in price indices.

Griliches also published important works on econometrics, including distributed lags (time series) and aggregation. He was particularly interested in the measurements of hidden variables.

Griliches served as president of the Econometric Society in 1975 and as president of the American Economic Association in 1993. From 1969 to 1977, he was one of the editors of the journal Econometrica. He served on the Stigler Commission in 1961 and the Boskin Commission in 1996, both of which were convened by the United States Senate to evaluate the measurement of inflation.

In 1965, Zvi Griliches won the prestigious John Bates Clark Medal. He was elected to the American Academy of Arts and Sciences in 1965 and to the National Academy of Sciences in 1975. He was also elected Distinguished Fellow of the American Economic Association, Fellow of the Econometric Society, Fellow of the American Statistical Association, Fellow of the American Association for the Advancement of Science, and Fellow of the American Agricultural Economics Association. He died on November 4, 1999, in Cambridge, Massachusetts.

== Memorials and tributes ==
The Zvi Griliches Research Data Center was established in his memory at the Samuel Neaman Institute for Advanced Studies in Science and Technology in Israel. The Zvi Griliches Excellence Award was established by the Economics Education and Research Consortium (EERC) in Russia and other former Soviet Union countries.

The Zvi Griliches Research Seminar in the Economics of Innovation was held by the Barcelona Graduate School of Economics to promote interactions between academic researchers, innovation policy practitioners, statistical office analysts and Ph.D. students with a general interest in analyzing technological innovation from an economic point of view.

In 2001, in memory of Zvi Griliches, the International Advisory Board of the New Economic School, with full approval by the entire NES community, decided to establish an annual series of lectures in economics. "The Zvi Griliches Memorial Lectures" are presented by leading scholars and open to everyone.

== Bibliography ==
- Diamond, Arthur M., Jr. "Zvi Griliches's Contributions to the Economics of Technology and Growth." Economics of Innovation and New Technology 13, no. 4 (June 2004): 365–97.
