= Consumer price index in the United States =

Statistics of the U.S. Bureau of Labor Statistics

United States Consumer Price Index (CPI)
Key U.S. Macroeconomic Indicator

Administration & Metadata
- Maintained By: Bureau of Labor Statistics (BLS)
- Frequency: Monthly
- Base Period: 1982–1984 = 100
- First Tracked: 1913

Latest Data (August 2026)
- CPI-U Level: 334.980
- Headline Inflation (YoY): 3.4%
- Core Inflation (YoY): 2.4% (Excludes food & energy)
- Monthly Change (MoM): +0.4% (Seasonally Adjusted)

Primary Variations
- CPI-U: All Urban Consumers; Covers ~93% of the U.S. population
- CPI-W: Urban Wage Earners & Clerical Workers; Covers ~29% of the population; used for Social Security COLAs
- C-CPI-U: Chained CPI; Accounts for consumer substitution behavior; used for federal tax bracket adjustments

Key Market Basket Sectors
- Core Expenditure Categories: • Shelter (~42% weight); • Food (At home & away from home); • Energy (Gasoline, electricity, gas utilities); • Transportation Services (Airfares, auto insurance); • Medical Care (Commodities & services); • Apparel, Education, and Recreation

Related Indexes
- Wholesale Level: Producer Price Index (PPI)
- Fed Preferred Metric: PCE Price Index

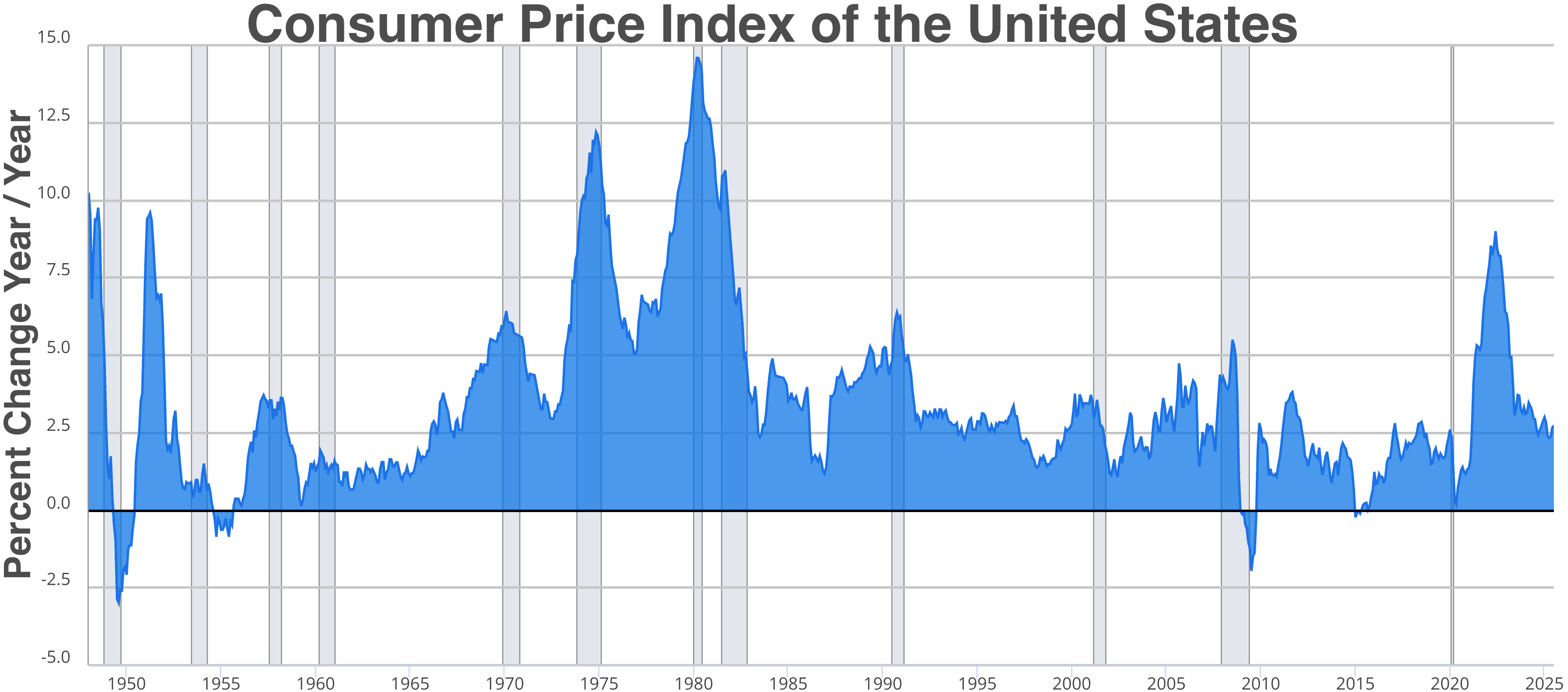
Consumer Price Index of the United States Year / Year

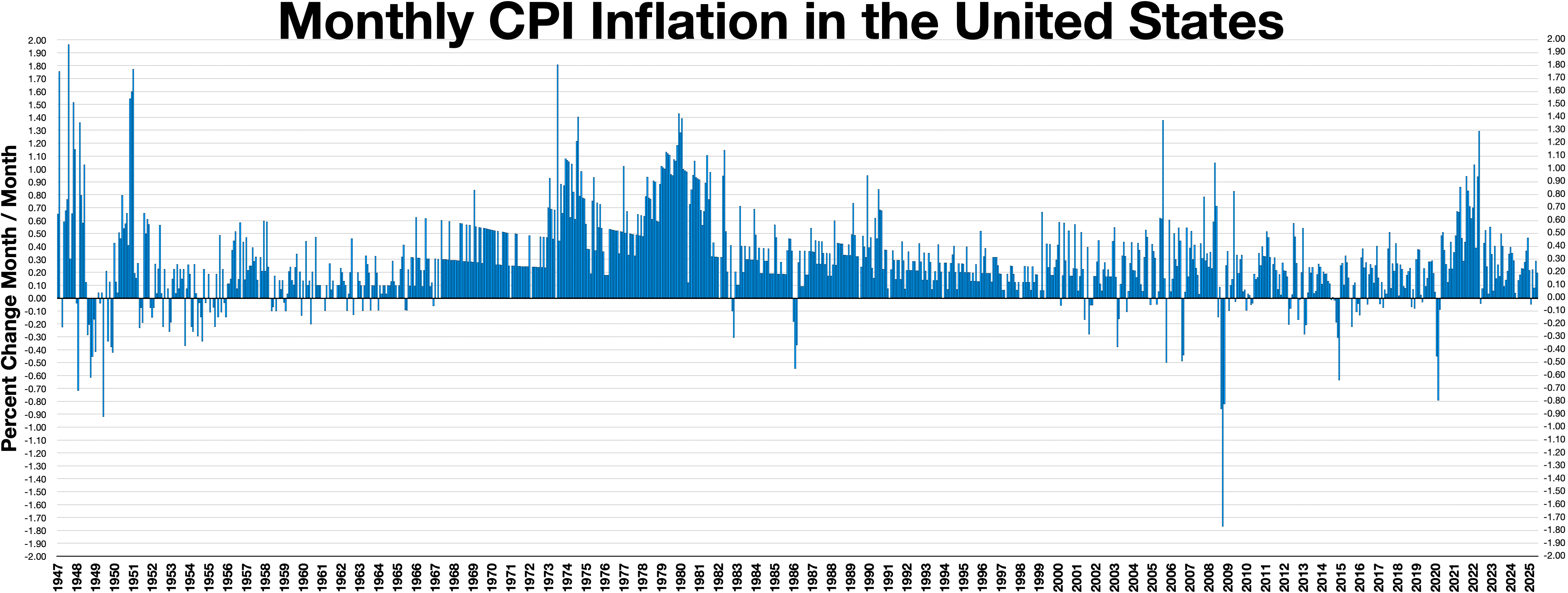
Monthly CPI in the United States

The United States Consumer Price Index (CPI) is a family of various consumer price indices published monthly by the United States Bureau of Labor Statistics (BLS). The most commonly used indices are the CPI-U and the CPI-W, though many alternative versions exist for different uses. For example, the CPI-U is the most popularly cited measure of consumer inflation in the United States, while the CPI-W is used to index Social Security benefit payments. The CPI is not the only measure of prices, with a related component being the Personal consumption expenditures price index (PCE) price index, which measures a more broad set of goods and services, among other differences.

== Methodology ==
=== Item coverage ===
The CPI, published by the U.S. Department of Labor (and also available on each Federal Reserve Bank’s website), measures the monthly price change of a “basket” of discretionary consumption goods whose price is borne by the consumer. There are eight major categories of items that are included in the CPI coverage; each includes both goods and services:

- Food and beverages
- Housing
- Apparel
- Transportation
- Medical care
- Recreation
- Education and communication
- Other goods and services

In line with this framework, the CPI excludes items such as life insurance, investment securities, financing costs, and house prices (though the value of owned housing, distinct from a house price, is included in the CPI), as these are considered to be investment items, not consumption. Also excluded are income and property taxes, employer-provided benefits, and the portion of healthcare costs paid by insurance plans or government programs such as Medicare, since these prices are not borne directly by consumers. However, sales and excise taxes, out-of-pocket healthcare costs, and health insurance premiums paid by the consumer (including Medicare Part B) are all included in the CPI, because consumers directly bear these costs. Finally, the prices of illegal goods such as marijuana are not measured, and so are also excluded. Some items, such as pleasure boats and pleasure aircraft, indeed belong in the scope of the CPI but are impractical to price; for these items, the price change is imputed to be the price change of a larger relevant category (eg. pleasure vehicles), while the weight is properly measured in the Consumer Expenditure Survey.

=== Population coverage and geographic sample ===
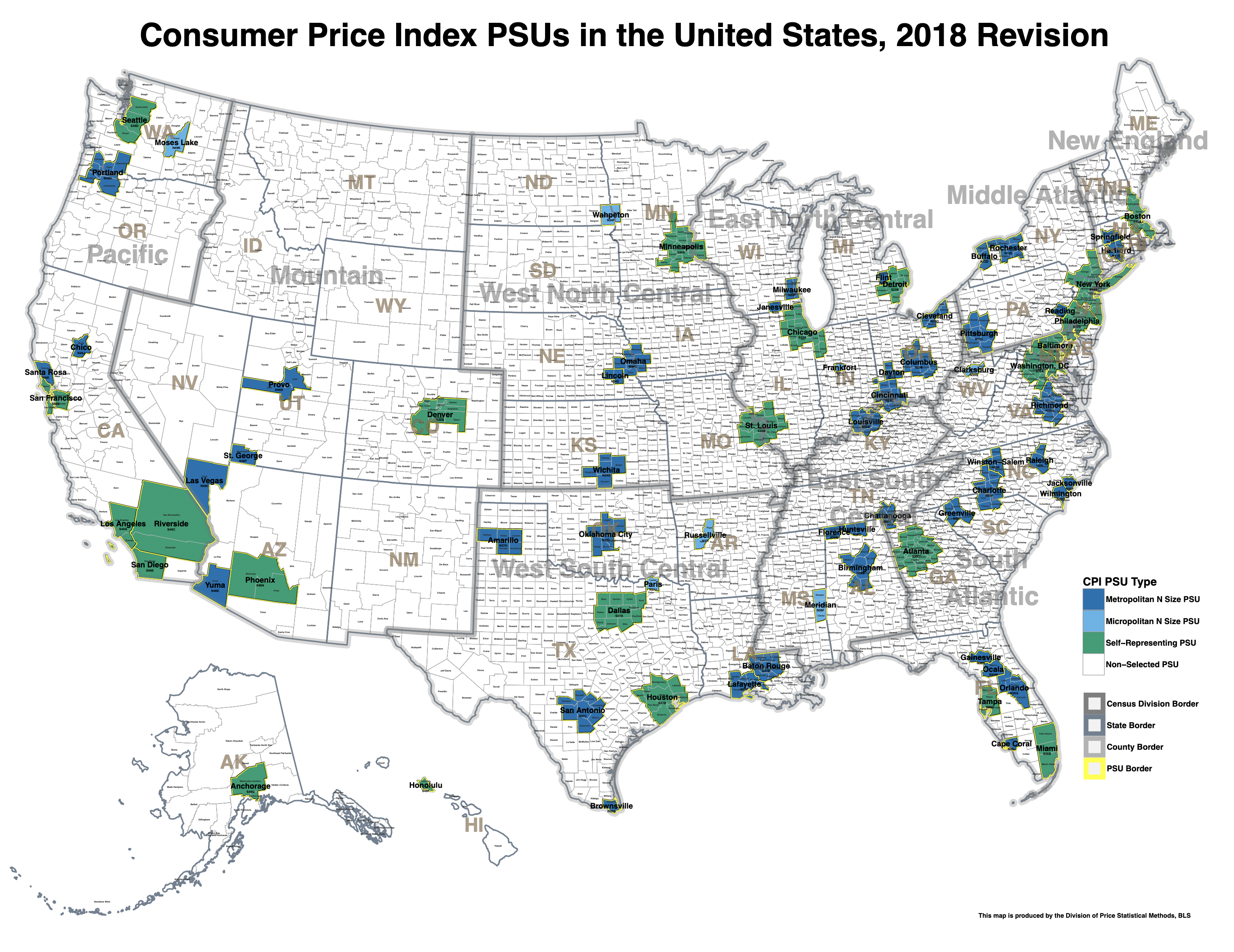
Map of areas sampled for use in the United States Consumer Price Index

The CPI-U measures inflation as experienced by a representative household in a metropolitan statistical area. Rural (non-metropolitan) households, farm households, military members, and the institutionalized (eg. prisons or hospitals) are excluded from consideration; with this exclusion, the CPI-U covers about 93 percent of the US population. The items considered, prices collected, and the locations where the prices are collected are all designed to represent the spending habits of such households.

The BLS divides the urban population into Primary Sampling Units (PSUs), equivalent to core-based statistical areas from the 2010 United States census. Prices are measured in only 75 of these PSUs. 23 of these CBSAs are known as self-representing PSUs, whose measured price changes apply to only that PSU. Of these CBSAs, 21 are metropolitan statistical areas with a population greater than 2.5 million (such as the Detroit-Warren-Dearborn, MI Metropolitan Statistical Area), while the remaining two are Anchorage, Alaska and Honolulu, Hawaii (which represent all of the CBSAs in Alaska and in Hawaii, respectively). These self-representing PSUs represent 42 percent of the CPI-U target population. The remaining 52 sampled PSUs are either metropolitan areas or micropolitan statistical areas; the price changes for all other PSUs are not measured in those PSUs themselves, but are imputed to be equivalent to the price change in one of the 52 sampled PSUs that is deemed to be equivalent. The clustering of all PSUs into equivalence classes is called stratification; nonself-representing PSUs are stratified using a variant of the k-means clustering algorithm, using four variables: latitude, longitude, median property value, and median household income. Within each stratum, the actual PSU chosen to be priced was chosen randomly. By sampling both large areas (self-representing PSUs) and smaller areas (nonself-representing PSUs), the CPI-U sample represents the full urban population of the United States, including areas of large population (such as the Houston Metropolitan Area) and areas with small population (such as the Paris, Texas micropolitan area).

=== Measuring Prices ===
Each month, BLS data collectors collect about 94,000 prices. For most items, these prices are collected by contacting the stores where the consumer purchases were made and measuring the price directly. This is usually by visiting the outlet in person (representing 2/3 of quotes) but sometimes via telephone or the store's website: as of 2017 about 8 percent of price quotes are taken from an online store, roughly in line with the fraction of consumer retail spending that goes through e-commerce. Other specific items, such as airfares, are priced via alternative, industry-specific data sources. Most prices are made on a per-unit basis, though some commodities such as gasoline or food items are priced by unit weight.

Some items are quality adjusted, meaning that the prices that are measured are adjusted to remove the change in price due to a change in quality or features of the item being introduced since the previous price was measured, a process called hedonic regression or hedonic adjustment. This is necessary in order to ensure that a constant, fixed item with fixed characteristics is being priced every period; when such an item no longer exists due to technological change in the consumer product landscape, a price is imputed using a new, existing product and estimating what its price would have been if it had the characteristics of the old product. Each category of quality-adjusted item is associated with a set of characteristics that are priced and a model for the marginal value of each of those characteristics. For example, the price of a smartphone is adjusted to remove (estimated) price changes due to the number of cameras, storage space, physical size, and other attributes of the smartphone.

==== Measuring Prices of Owned Housing ====
Beginning in 1983 for the CPI-U (and 1985 for the CPI-W), the pricing method for owned housing uses a framework called Renters' Equivalence. Prior to this, the CPI would measure the price of homes, the cost of monthly mortgage payments, property taxes, insurance, and maintenance. However, this method conflated the investment portion of owned housing (as an investment that was financed via all of those expenditures) and the consumption portion (the flow of services - ie. shelter - to the occupant household). In addition, new financial developments at the time meant that the data sources in the old method were becoming unrepresentative of consumers total costs of housing. For example, mortgages with shorter duration or variable rates, or financing at below-bank rates all were increasingly unreflected in federal data. The previous method was also unable to account for changes in quality of the sampled housing stock, while the CPI conceptual framework measures the price of a fixed-quality basket of goods.

The current method instead measures only the rental payments for rented units, and for owned housing, imputes the rental equivalence - the monthly amount that the house would rent for, if it was rented out instead of occupied by the owner. First, rental payments are priced and adjusted for depreciation of the property (via the age-bias regression model). Then, the "economic rent" is calculated, which adjusts for any changes in the structure or facilities. Finally, a "pure rent" is calculated, which removes from the economic rent the actual provision of utilities such as electricity and gas - these are measured in a separate index, to divide a rental contract's provided services between shelter and utilities provision. Finally, the CPI for Rent measures the change in economic rents, because utilities are often provided in rental agreements; while the CPI for Owners Equivalent Rent (OER) measures the change in pure rents.

=== Aggregation ===
For each entry level item (eg. apples in the Philadelphia metropolitan area) many different price quotes were made in each month. To aggregate these individual price measurements into an index for the item-location combination, a geometric means formula is usually used:

$\ln{G} = \sum_{j} w_j \ln{\frac{P_{j, t}}{P_{j, t-1}}}$ where $G$ is the growth rate of the index, $j$ enumerates all relevant price measurements that are present in both months, $w_j$ represents a fractional weight of the item as measured in a base period, $P_{j, t}$ represents the price of the item $j$ as measured in the current month, and $P_{j, t-1}$ represents the price of the same item as measured in the previous month. For some shelter services, some utilities and government fees, and medical services, a Laspeyres formula is used instead: $G = \frac{\sum_j w_j \frac{P_{j, t}}{P_{j, b}}}{\sum_j w_j \frac{P_{j, t-1}}{P_{j, b}}}$where $P_{j, b}$ represents the price of the item in the base period. The geometric formula implicitly assumes that consumers exhibit substitution behavior among the various different quoted items (such as apples purchased from one particular grocery store versus another grocery store), whereas the Laspeyres formula does not assume such substitution behavior - indeed, the Laspeyres items are not considered to be exactly uniform or substitutable with each other, even if they represent the same category of item and in the same PSU.

=== Weights ===
Each item is given a weight, used in the above formula, so that items that consumers spend more on are weighted higher (ie. with more importance) than items that consumers spend less on. These weights derive from the Consumer Expenditure survey, which collates how much money consumers spend on various consumption items. The various CPI programs (such as CPI-U and CPI-W) are designed to represent different groups of US consumers, and typically achieve this goal by using a different set of weights, derived from a different segment of the Consumer Expenditures survey. For most programs, the weights are updated annually using the results of the previous years' Consumer Expenditure survey, though prior to 2023 data the weights were updated biennially (once every two years), and prior to the 1980s, the weights were updated approximately once per decade.

== The different CPI indices ==
=== CPI for All Urban Consumers ===
Introduced in 1978, the CPI-U is the most widely used CPI measure in popular media and understanding. Its sampling is designed to represent the consumption baskets of residents of urban and metropolitan areas, which collectively account for over 90 percent of the US population.

=== CPI for urban wage earners and clerical workers (CPI-W) ===
Consumer Price Index for Urban Wage Earners and Clerical Workers (CPI-W)
U.S. Economic Indicator

Overview
- Official Abbreviation: CPI-W
- Maintained By: Bureau of Labor Statistics (BLS)
- Frequency: Monthly
- Base Year: 1982–1984 = 100

Demographics & Scope
- Target Population: Urban households deriving >50% income from clerical or hourly wage occupations
- Population Coverage: Approx. 29%–30% of the total U.S. population
- Exclusions: Salaried professionals, self-employed, retirees, unemployed, rural consumers, military

Primary Applications
- Federal Benefits: Social Security Cost-of-Living Adjustments (COLA)
- Labor Relations: Collective bargaining agreements (escalator clauses)

Relationship to Sister Indices
- Broad Market Index: CPI-U (Covers ~93% of population)
- Historical Context: Direct continuation of the original CPI established in the early 20th century

The urban wage earner and clerical worker population consists of consumer units consisting of clerical workers, sales workers, craft workers, operative, service workers, or laborers. (Excluded from this population are professional, managerial, and technical workers; the self-employed; short-term workers; the unemployed; and retirees and others not in the labor force.) More than one half of the consumer unit's income has to be earned from the above occupations, and at least one of the members must be employed for 37 weeks or more in an eligible occupation. The consumer price index for urban wage earners and clerical workers (CPI-W) is a continuation of the historical index that was introduced after World War I for use in wage negotiation. As new uses were developed for the CPI, the need for a broader and more representative index became apparent. The Social Security Administration uses the CPI-W as the basis for its periodic COLA (cost-of-living adjustment).

=== Core CPI ===
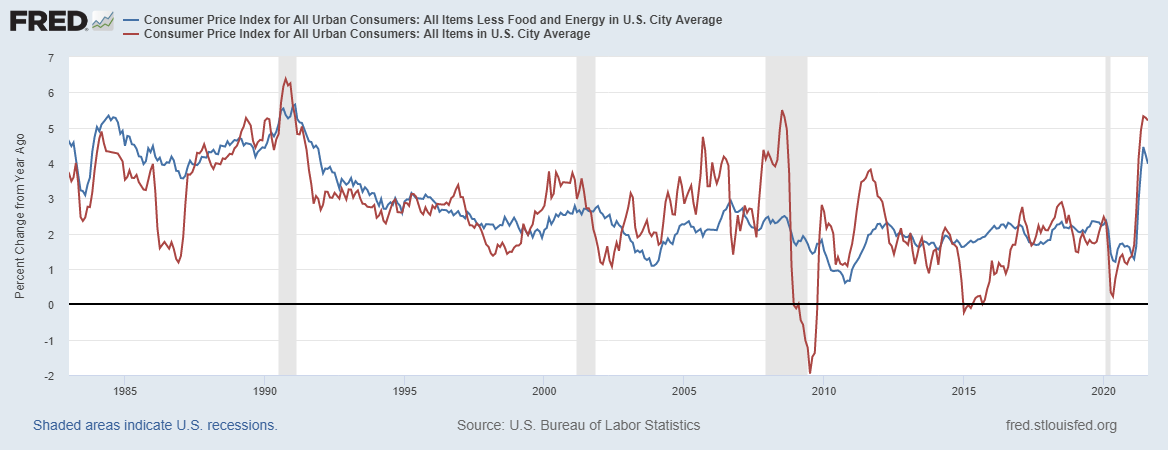
Core CPI (blue) is less volatile than the full CPI-U (red), shown here as the annual percentage change, 1983–2021

A Core CPI index is a CPI that excludes goods with high price volatility, typically food and energy, so as to gauge a more underlying, widespread, or fundamental inflation that affects broader sets of items. More specifically, food and energy prices are subject to large changes that often fail to persist and do not represent relative price changes. In many instances, large movements in food and energy prices arise because of supply disruptions such as drought or OPEC-led cutbacks in production. This metric was introduced by Arthur F. Burns in the early 1970s, when food and especially oil prices were quite volatile, as an inflation metric that was less subject to short term shocks. Today, however, the Federal Reserve targets the average level personal consumption expenditures price index, not Core CPI, primarily because it covers a larger portion of the economy and so is a more general measure of price inflation than the CPI.

=== Chained CPI for all urban consumers (C-CPI-U) ===
This index applies to the same target population as the CPI-U, but the weights are updated each month. This allows the weights to evolve more gracefully with people's consumption patterns.For CPI-U, the weights are updated only every January and reflecting the consumption patterns two years behind and is held constant for an entire year.

=== CPI for the elderly (CPI-E) ===
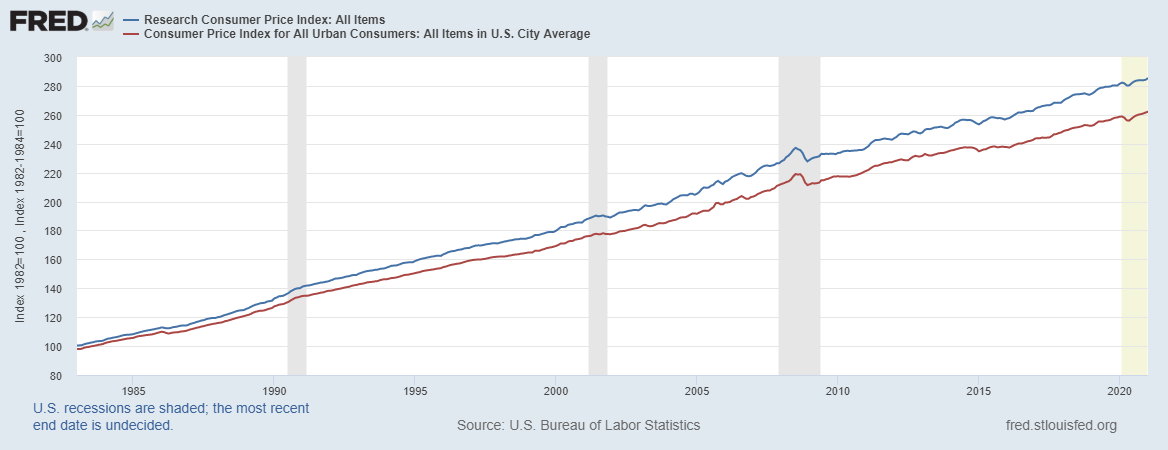
The CPI-E (blue) has grown faster than the CPI-U (red)

Since at least 1982, the BLS has also computed a consumer price index for the elderly to account for the fact that the consumption patterns of seniors are different from those of younger people. For the BLS, "elderly" means that the reference person or a spouse is at least 62 years of age; approximately 24 percent of all consumer units meet this definition. Individuals in this group consume roughly double the amount of medical care as all consumers in CPI-U or employees in CPI-W.

In January of each year, Social Security recipients receive a cost of living adjustment (COLA) "to ensure that the purchasing power of Social Security and Supplemental Security Income (SSI) benefits is not eroded by inflation. It is based on the percentage increase in the consumer price index for urban wage earners and clerical workers (CPI-W)".

However, from December 1982 through December 2011, the all-items CPI-E rose at an annual average rate of 3.1 percent, compared with increases of 2.9 percent for both the CPI-U and CPI-W. This suggests that the elderly have been losing purchasing power at the rate of roughly 0.2 (=3.1–2.9) percentage points per year.

In 2003 Hobijn and Lagakos estimated that the social security trust fund would run out of money in 40 years using CPI-W and in 35 years using CPI-E.

== Uses ==
- As an economic indicator. As the most widely used measure of inflation, the CPI is an indicator of the effectiveness of government fiscal and monetary policy, especially for inflation-targeting monetary policy by the Federal Reserve. Now however, the Federal Reserve System targets the personal consumption expenditures (PCE) price index instead of CPI as a measure of inflation. Business executives, labor leaders, and other private citizens also use the CPI as a guide in making economic decisions.
- As a deflator of other economic series. The CPI and its components are used to adjust other economic series for price change and to translate these series into inflation-free dollars.

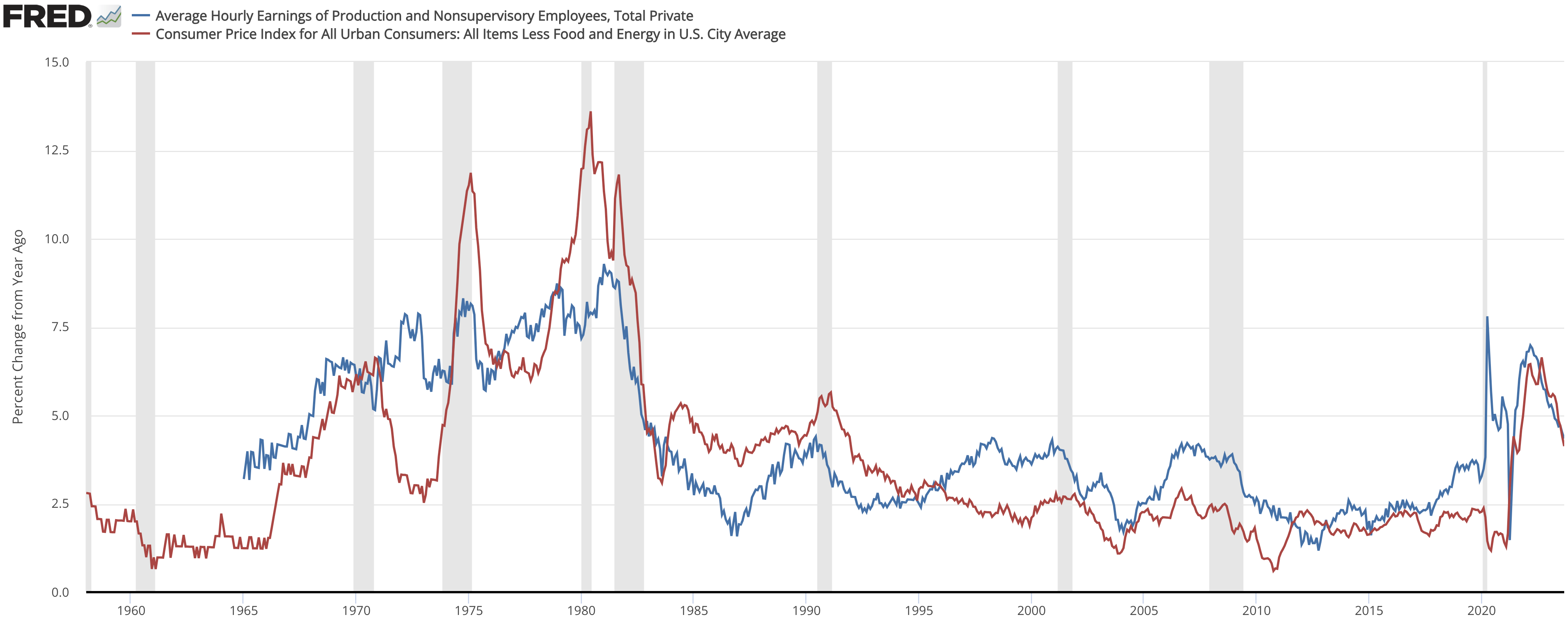
CPI compared to wages (Percent Change Year/Year) Private sector employee wages Core CPI

- As a means for indexation (i.e. adjusting income payments). Over 2 million workers are covered by collective bargaining agreements which tie wages to the CPI. In the United States, the index affects the income of almost 80 million people as a result of statutory action: 47.8 million Social Security beneficiaries, about 4.1 million military and Federal civil service retirees and survivors, and about 22.4 million food stamp recipients. Changes in the CPI also affect the cost of lunches for the 26.7 million children who eat lunch at school. Some private firms and individuals use the CPI to keep rents, royalties, alimony payments and child support payments in line with changing prices. Since 1985, the CPI has been used to adjust the Federal income tax structure to prevent inflation-induced increases in taxes.
- Starting January 1, 2027 the minimum wage of Nebraska will increase annually based on the consumer price index.

== History ==
US Historical Inflation Ancient

The Consumer Price Index was initiated during World War I, when rapid increases in prices, particularly in shipbuilding centers, made an index essential for calculating cost-of-living adjustments in wages. To provide appropriate weighting patterns for the index, it reflected the relative importance of goods and services purchased in 92 different industrial centers from 1917 until 1919. Periodic collection of prices was started, and in 1919 the Bureau of Labor Statistics began publication of separate indexes for 32 cities. Regular publication of a national index, the U.S. city average began in 1921, and indexes were estimated back to 1913 using records of food prices. The economist Elizabeth Ellis Hoyt, while working for the National Industrial Conference Board between 1915 and 1921, compiled cost-of-living metrics into what is considered the forerunner of the Consumer Price Index.

Because people's buying habits had changed substantially, a new study was made covering expenditures in the years 1934–1936, which provided the basis for a comprehensively revised index introduced in 1940. During World War II, when many commodities were scarce and goods were rationed, the index weights were adjusted temporarily to reflect these shortages. In 1951, the BLS again made interim adjustments, based on surveys of consumer expenditures in seven cities between 1947 and 1949, to reflect the most important effects of immediate postwar changes in buying patterns. The index was again revised in 1953 and 1964.

In 1978, the index was revised to reflect the spending patterns based upon the surveys of consumer expenditures conducted in 1972–1974. A new and expanded 85-area sample was selected based on the 1970 Census of Population. The Point-of-Purchase Survey (POPS) was also introduced. POPS eliminated reliance on outdated secondary sources for screening samples of establishments or outlets where prices are collected. A second, more broadly based CPI for All Urban Consumers, the CPI-U was also introduced. The CPI-U took into account the buying patterns of professional and salaried workers, part-time workers, the self-employed, the unemployed, and retired people, in addition to wage earners and clerical workers.

== Perceived errors in estimation ==
=== Perceived overestimation of inflation ===
In 1995, the Senate Finance Committee appointed a commission to study CPI's ability to estimate inflation. The CPI commission found in their study that the index overestimated the cost of living by a value between 0.8 and 1.6 percentage points.

If CPI overestimates inflation, then claims that real wages have fallen over time could be unfounded. An overestimation of only a few tenths of a percentage point per annum compounds dramatically over time. In the 1970s and 80s the federal government began indexing several transfers and taxes including social security (see below Uses of the CPI). The overestimation of CPI would imply that the increases in these taxes and transfers have been greater than necessary, meaning the government and taxpayers have overpaid for them.

The Commission concluded that more than half of the overestimation was due to slow adjustments in the index to new products or changes in product quality. At that time, the weights for indices like CPI-U and CPI-W were updated only once per decade; today, they are updated in January of even-numbered years. However, even with this more frequent updates, the CPI-U and CPI-W might still be excessively slow in responding to new technologies. For example, by 1996 there were over 47 million cellular phone users in the United States, but the weights for the CPI did not account for this new product until 1998. This new product lowered costs of communication when away from the home. The commission recommended that the BLS update weights more frequently to prevent upward bias in the index from a failure to properly account for the benefits of new products.

Additional upward biases were said to come from several other sources. Fixed weights do not accommodate consumer substitutions among commodities, such as buying more chicken when the price of beef increases. Because the CPI assumes that people continue to buy beef, it would increase even if people are buying chicken instead. However, this is by design: the CPI measures the change in expenses required for people to maintain the same standard of living. The Commission also found that 99% of all data were collected during the week, although an increasing amount of purchases happen during the weekend. Additional bias was said to stem from changes in retailing that were unaccounted for in the CPI.

=== Perceived underestimation of inflation ===
Some critics believe however, that because of changes to the way that the CPI is calculated, and because energy and food price changes were excluded from the Federal Reserve's calculation of "core inflation", that inflation is being dramatically underestimated. The second argument is unrelated to the CPI, except insofar as the calculation of CPI is modified in response to a perceived overstatement of inflation.

The Federal Reserve's policy of ignoring food and energy prices when making interest rate decisions is often confused with the measurement of the CPI by the Bureau of Labor Statistics. The BLS publishes both a headline CPI which counts food and energy prices, and also a CPI for "all items less food and energy", or "core" CPI. None of the prominent legislated uses of the CPI excludes food and energy. However, with regard to calculating inflation, the Federal Reserve no longer uses the CPI, preferring to use core PCE instead.

Some critics believe that changes in CPI calculation due to the Boskin Commission have led to dramatic cuts in inflation estimates. They believe that using pre-Boskin methods, which they also think are still used by most other countries, the current U.S. inflation is estimated to be around 7% per year. The BLS maintains that these beliefs are based on misunderstandings of the CPI. For example, the BLS has stated that changes made due to the introduction of the geometric mean formula to account for product substitution (one of the Boskin recommended changes) have lowered the measured rate of inflation by less than 0.3% per year, and the methods now used are commonly employed in the CPIs of developed nations.

== See also ==
- Consumer price index
- Cost of living
- Boskin Commission
- Stigler Commission
- Inflation
- Core inflation
- Bureau of Labor Statistics
- Producer price index
- GDP deflator
- Misery index (economics)
- Monetary policy
- Hedonic regression
- GDP deflator
- Outline of economics
- Retail Price Index
