= Boskin Commission =

US government commission

The Boskin Commission, formally called the "Advisory Commission to Study the Consumer Price Index", was appointed by the United States Senate in 1995 to study possible bias in the computation of the Consumer Price Index (CPI), which is used to measure inflation in the United States. Its final report, titled "Toward A More Accurate Measure Of The Cost Of Living" and issued on December 4, 1996, concluded that the CPI overstated inflation by about 1.1 percentage points per year in 1996 and about 1.3 percentage points prior to 1996.

The report was important because inflation, as calculated by the Bureau of Labor Statistics, is used to index the annual payment increases in Social Security and other retirement and compensation programs. This implied that the federal budget had increased by more than it should have, and that projections of future budget deficits were too large. The original report calculated that the overstatement of inflation would add $148 billion to the deficit and $691 billion to the national debt by 2006.

The report highlighted four sources of possible bias:

- Substitution bias occurs because a fixed market basket fails to reflect the fact that consumers substitute relatively less for more expensive goods when relative prices change.
- Outlet substitution bias occurs when shifts to lower price outlets are not properly handled.
- Quality change bias occurs when improvements in the quality of products, such as greater energy efficiency or less need for repair, are measured inaccurately or not at all.
- New product bias occurs when new products are not introduced in the market basket, or included only with a long lag.

The members of the Boskin Commission were:

- Michael Boskin, Stanford University (Chair)
- Ellen R. Dulberger
- Robert J. Gordon
- Zvi Griliches
- Dale Jorgenson

The Boskin Commission was the first extensive evaluation of inflation measurement since the Stigler Commission in 1961. Griliches was also on that commission.
