= Robert J. Gordon =

American economist

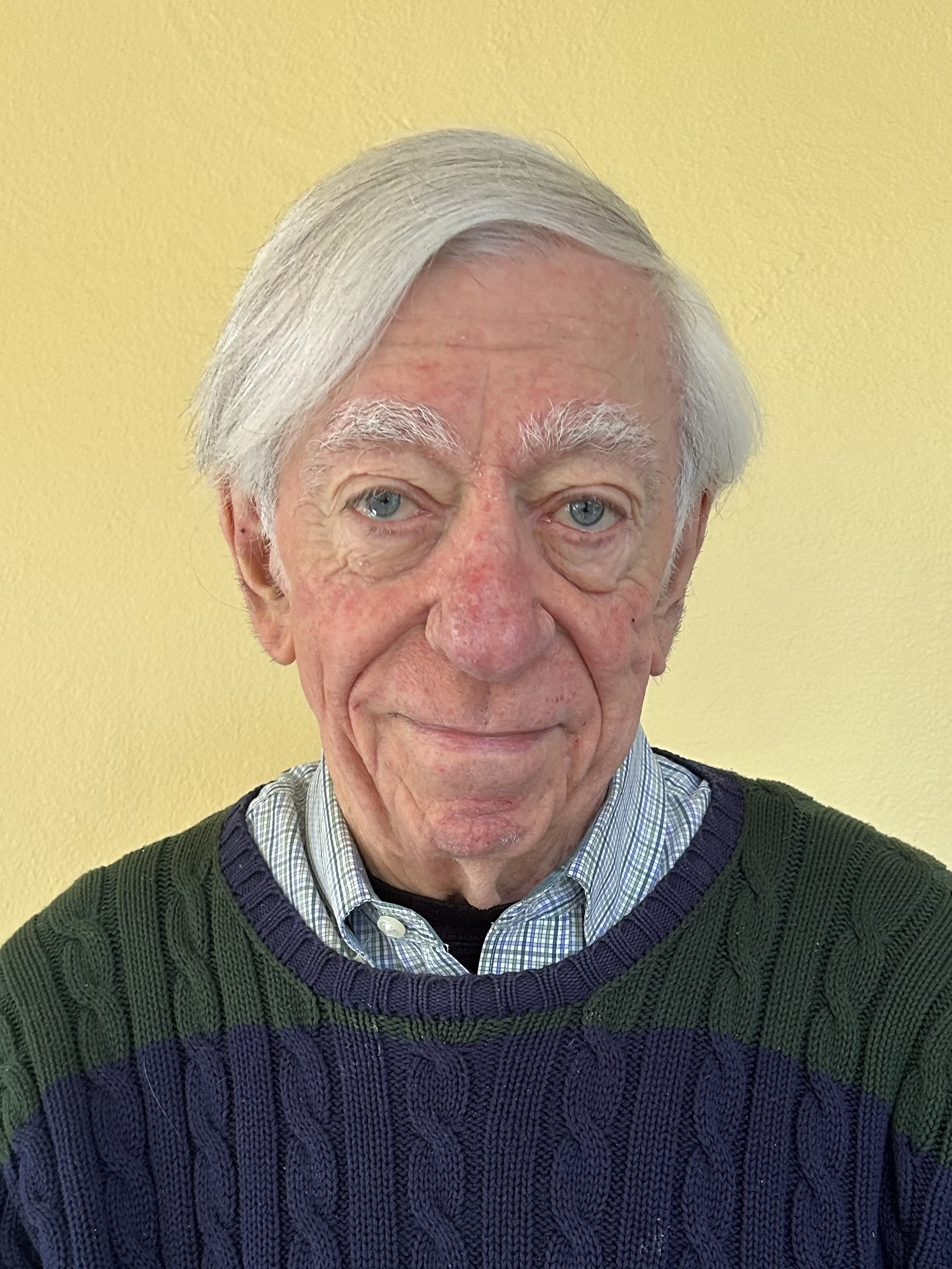
- Born: September 3, 1940 (age 86)

Academic background
- Education: Harvard University (1962); Oxford University (1964); MIT (1967)
- Doctoral advisor: Robert Solow

Academic work
- Discipline: Macroeconomics; Social economics
- School or tradition: New Keynesian economics
- Institutions: Northwestern University
- Notable ideas: Core inflation Productivity; Growth theory
- Website: Gordon Economics

Robert James Gordon is an American economist. He is the Stanley G. Harris Professor of the Social Sciences at Northwestern University and one of the world's leading experts on inflation, unemployment, and long-term economic growth.

He is known for his work on U.S. economic growth, productivity, inflation, and price measurement. His research has had significant influence on both academic scholarship and economic policy, particularly in the areas of historical productivity analysis, supply shocks, and inflation measurement.

== Family ==
Gordon is a member of a family of economists. Both his parents Robert Aaron and Margaret earned distinction independently, each contributing to economic knowledge with a view to real practical benefit for society, as did his brother David, himself more of a radical.

His father was the President of the American Economic Association in 1975.

Also his father is the namesake of the "Gordon Report" which proposed reforms for the computation of the unemployment rate by the US Department of Labor Bureau of Labor Statistics. He currently resides in Evanston, Illinois with his wife Julie, who was the executive director of the Econometric Society from 1975 to 2005.

== Education ==
Gordon earned a B.A. in economics from Harvard University in 1962, graduating magna cum laude and receiving the Allyn Young Prize. He studied at Oxford University as a Marshall Scholar, completing an A.B. in 1964 and an A.M. in 1969 with first-class honors in Philosophy, Politics, and Economics. At Oxford he also won the George Webb Medley Senior Prize in Economics.

He received his Ph.D. in economics from the Massachusetts Institute of Technology (MIT) in 1967, supported by National Science Foundation and Ford Foundation fellowships. His doctoral dissertation, Problems in the Measurement of Real Investment in the U.S. Private Economy, reflected an early interest in issues of productivity and measurement.

== Academic career ==
Gordon began his teaching career as an assistant professor at Harvard University in 1967–68 before moving to the University of Chicago, where he taught until 1973. He joined Northwestern University in 1973 and was named Stanley G. Harris Professor of the Social Sciences in 1987. He chaired the Department of Economics from 1992 to 1996. He was elected a Fellow of the Econometric Society in 1977, a Fellow of the American Academy of Arts and Sciences in 1997, and a Distinguished Fellow of the American Economic Association in 2014. He received an honorary doctorate from the Sorbonne in Paris in 2024.

Since 1968, Gordon has also been a research associate of the National Bureau of Economic Research (NBER), where he has contributed to programs on economic fluctuations, growth, productivity, and international finance. He has served on the NBER's Business Cycle Dating Committee since 1978 and co-chaired the International Seminar on Macroeconomics (1978–94). He has also been a research fellow of the Centre on Economic Policy Research (London) since 1983.

Gordon has been active in professional service, including long tenure as treasurer of the Econometric Society (1975–2005), membership on the editorial boards of leading journals, and advisory roles for U.S. and international institutions such as the Congressional Budget Office, the Bureau of Economic Analysis, and the “Boskin Commission” on the Consumer Price Index.

From 1995 to 1997, he served on the Boskin Commission to assess the accuracy of the United States Consumer Price Index (CPI), having written the definitive criticism of CPI inflation overstatement in 1990.

== Research ==
=== Long-term U.S. economic growth ===
Gordon's best-known work, The Rise and Fall of American Growth (2016), analyzes U.S. productivity and living standards since the Civil War.

He argues that the “Great Inventions” of the late 19th and early 20th centuries electricity, the internal combustion engine, clean water and sanitation, chemicals, and modern communications drove unprecedented productivity growth between 1920 and 1970.

Gordon also highlights structural “headwinds” that are likely to reduce future U.S. growth, including demographic change, rising debt, inequality, slowing increase of educational attainment, retreat from globalization, and environmental challenges.

=== Inflation dynamics and supply shocks ===
In the 1970s, Gordon developed a framework for incorporating supply shocks, such as oil price increases, into models of inflation.

His work clarified policy trade-offs during stagflation and highlighted the amplifying role of wage indexation. He introduced the now-standard distinction between “headline” and “core” inflation, showing that the latter provides a better measure of underlying price trends. His numerous subsequent papers on inflation introduced the roles of flexible exchange rates and the time-varying natural rate of unemployment (or NAIRU).

=== Productivity growth and World War II ===
In a 1969 study, Gordon reinterpreted the surge of mid-20th-century productivity growth by documenting that most wartime capital investment was government-financed but omitted from official statistics. This work invented the concept of “GOPO” capital (Government Owned, Privately Operated). Correcting this bias, he described productivity between 1929 and 1948 as “One Big Wave,” reshaping historical accounts of America's golden age of growth.

=== Price measurement ===
Gordon's book The Measurement of Durable Goods Prices (1990) provided detailed evidence that official price indexes overstated inflation by underestimating quality improvements in products such as automobiles, aircraft, computers, and home appliances. His hedonic price indexes influenced revisions in government statistical methods and were central to the work of the Boskin Commission (1995–97). Subsequent papers measured bias in price indexes for housing and apparel. He also introduced a new methodology for measuring GDP prior to World War 2.

== Selected works ==
=== Books ===
- The Rise and Fall of American Growth: The U.S. Standard of Living Since the Civil War. Princeton University Press. 2016. ISBN 978-0691147727.
- Gordon, Robert J.; Pelkmans, Jacques (1979). Challenges to interdependent economics: the industrial West in the coming decade. 1980s project studies / Council on Foreign Relations. New York, NY: McGraw-Hill. ISBN 978-0-07-023810-7.
- Friedman, Milton (1990). Gordon, Robert J. (ed.). Milton Friedman's monetary framework: a debate with his critics (5. [print.] ed.). Chicago: Univ. of Chicago Press. ISBN 978-0-226-26408-0.
- Gordon, Robert J. (ed.). The American Business Cycle: Continuity and Change. National Bureau of Economic Research Conference Report. Chicago, IL: University of Chicago Press.
- De Menil, George; Gordon, Robert J., eds. (1991). International volatility and economic growth: the first ten years of the International Seminar on Macroeconomics. Amsterdam: North-Holland. ISBN 978-0-444-89284-3.
- Bresnahan, Timothy F.; Gordon, Robert J. (eds.). The Economics of New Goods. National Bureau of Economic Research Studies in Income and Wealth. Chicago, IL: University of Chicago Press.
- Macroeconomics. Addison Wesley. 2002. ISBN 978-0-201-77036-0.
- The Measurement of Durable Goods Prices. University of Chicago Press. 1990. ISBN 978-0-226-30455-7.

=== Journals ===
- Gordon, Robert J. (1968). "Incidence of the Corporation Tax in U.S. Manufacturing: Reply". The American Economic Review. 58 (5): 1360–1367. ISSN 0002-8282. JSTOR 1814037.
- Gordon, Robert J. (1969). "$45 Billion of U.S. Private Investment Has Been Mislaid". American Economic Review. 59 (3): 221–238.
- Gordon, Robert J.; Nordhaus, William; Poole, William (1973). "The Welfare Cost of Higher Unemployment". Brookings Papers on Economic Activity. 1973 (1): 133. doi:10.2307/2534086. ISSN 0007-2303. JSTOR 2534086.
- Gordon, Robert J. (1975). "The Demand for and Supply of Inflation" (PDF). Journal of Law and Economics. 18 (3): 807–836. doi:10.1086/466845. JSTOR 725066. S2CID 153671471.
- Gordon, Robert J. (1976). "Recent Developments in the Theory of Inflation and Unemployment" (PDF). Journal of Monetary Economics. 2 (2): 195–219. doi:10.1016/0304-3932(76)90033-7. hdl:10419/220558.
- Gordon, Robert J. (March 1982). "Why U.S. Wage and Employment Behaviour Differs From That in Britain and Japan". The Economic Journal. 92 (365): 13–44. doi:10.2307/2232253. ISSN 0013-0133. JSTOR 2232253.
- Gordon, Robert J. (1982). "Price Inertia and Policy Ineffectiveness in the United States, 1890-1980". Journal of Political Economy. 90 (6): 1087–1117. doi:10.1086/261113. ISSN 0022-3808.
- Balke, Nathan S.; Gordon, Robert J. (1989). "The Estimation of Prewar Gross National Product: Methodology and New Evidence". Journal of Political Economy. 97 (1): 38–92. doi:10.1086/261593. ISSN 0022-3808.
- Gordon, Robert J (1997-02-01). "The Time-Varying NAIRU and its Implications for Economic Policy". Journal of Economic Perspectives. 11 (1): 11–32. doi:10.1257/jep.11.1.11. ISSN 0895-3309.
- Gordon, Robert J (2000-11-01). "Does the "New Economy" Measure up to the Great Inventions of the Past?". Journal of Economic Perspectives. 14 (4): 49–74. doi:10.1257/jep.14.4.49. ISSN 0895-3309.
