= Maddala =

Maddala (Telugu: మద్దాల) is a Telugu surname. Notable people with the surname include:

- G. S. Maddala (1933–1999), Indian-American economist, mathematician, and teacher
- Vivek Maddala (born 1973), American composer
