= David Gordon (economist) =

American economist and professor (1944–1996)

- Image of David M. Gordon
- Born: May 4, 1944; Washington, D.C., U.S.
- Died: March 16, 1996 (aged 51); Manhattan, New York City, U.S.

Academic background
- Education: Harvard University (BA)
- Influences: Karl Marx, Samuel Bowles

Academic work
- Discipline: Macroeconomics; political economy; labor economics
- School or tradition: Neo-Marxian economics
- Institutions: Graduate Faculty, New School for Social Research

David M. Gordon (May 4, 1944 – March 16, 1996) was an American economist and academic. Gordon served as a professor at The New School for Social Research in New York City. In 1995, he established the Schwartz Center for Economic Policy Analysis (SCEPA).

== Early life and education ==
Born in Washington, D.C. Gordon attended high school in Berkeley, California before graduating from Harvard University with a B.A. in economics in 1965. His parents, Robert Aaron Gordon and Margaret S. Gordon, were both economics professors at the University of California, Berkeley. His father served as the president of the American Economic Association in 1975, and his mother specialized in employment and social welfare policy. His brother, Robert J. Gordon, is a macroeconomist.

Gordon was associated with the New U.S. School of Radical Political Economy in the mid-1960s. As a graduate student of economics at Harvard in the late 1960s, he worked as a research assistant, evaluating Great Society programs. The work included studies relating to chronically unemployed and low-income populations in Oakland, California, and Boston. In 1965, Gordon and other Harvard students founded a civil rights newspaper, The Southern Courier, in Atlanta. He completed a doctoral thesis named Class, Productivity, and the Ghetto and earned his PhD in economics in 1971. From 1970 to 1973, he worked as a research associate at the National Bureau of Economic Research, then located in New York City. In 1973, he joined the Graduate Faculty in the Economics Department at the New School for Social Research, where he continued to teach until his death in 1996.

Gordon was a founding member of the Union for Radical Political Economics (URPE). URPE has been described as an alternative professional organisation for left-wing political economists. Since 1998, the Review of Radical Political Economics has published an annual David Gordon Memorial Lecture. At the University of Massachusetts Amherst, the Political Economy Research Institute is housed in Gordon Hall, named after Gordon and Glen Gordon (no relation).

== Career ==
According to published assessments, Gordon's research from the late 1960s until his death in 1996 progressed through areas of labour economics, institutional macroeconomic analysis, and neo-Marxian economic modeling. From the late 1960s through the late 1970s, he worked mainly in labor economics, focusing on segmented labor markets, often in collaboration with Richard Edwards and Michael Reich. During the 1980s, he analyzed the long-term development of the U.S. economy and, with Samuel Bowles and Thomas E. Weisskopf, developed a historical and institutional approach to macroeconomic analysis linked to economic policy proposals. From the late 1980s until the mid-1990s, he developed a neo-Marxian model of the U.S. macroeconomy and extended his work on the relationship between workplace organisation, managerial supervision, and labor outcomes in the United States.

=== Labor economics ===
As a graduate student, Gordon authored Theories of Poverty and Underemployment (1971), which surveyed and critiqued alternative economic perspectives on urban poverty, drawing on both his own research and the broader literature. His best-known contributions to labor economics critiqued the mainstream economic assumption of a unified labor market and argued instead for the recognition of multiple labor markets separated by deep, historically shaped divisions along racial, gender, and class lines. However, he did not believe that class differences meant that the interests of ordinary people are always opposed to those of the upper classes, arguing that more democratic and egalitarian economic policies are in the interest of everyone. Gordon's joint research with Edwards and Reich in this area culminated in the publication of their co-authored book, Segmented Work, Divided Workers: The Historical Transformation of Labor in the United States (1982).

=== Macroeconomic analysis and economic policy ===
In 1979, Gordon became co-chair of a commission on economic problems set up by the Progressive Alliance, a political coalition of more than 200 organizations representing labor, citizens, civil rights, and women's organizations. He felt that a new and overarching analysis of the U.S. economy was needed in order to understand the macroeconomic travails of the time and to guide proposals for change. From the late 1970s to the late 1980s, Gordon collaborated with Samuel Bowles and Thomas Weisskopf on historical and institutional analyses of the post-World War II U.S. economy, examining the causes of economic expansion and subsequent structural shifts. Gordon, Bowles, and Weisskopf's account of the post-war boom emphasized institutional and political factors such as sustained full employment during the middle-to-late 1960s, the erosion of U.S. world hegemony, and the rise of environmental and other citizen movements.

They argue that the boom ended because the institutional structures could no longer restrain the claims of rivals (both domestic and international) against the profits of U.S. corporations and that a new and more just social and economic order would be needed to restore prosperity. Gordon's work with Bowles and Weisskopf led to numerous econometric and historical studies on the dynamics of stagflation, the slowdown of productivity growth, and the determinants of profitability and investment, which were published in a series of articles in economic journals. The collaboration also led to two co-authored books for a general audience, namely Beyond the Waste Land: A Democratic Alternative to Economic Decline (1983) and After the Waste Land: A Democratic Economics for the Year 2000 (1991).

=== Macroeconomic modeling and labor control ===
Gordon contributed to debates on economic growth and development by linking historical institutional frameworks to successive economic cycles, an approach described in secondary literature on neo-Marxian economics. His approach sought to explain successive booms and crises in a capitalist economy in terms of successive institutional frameworks, related to the Neo-Marxian term successive social structures of accumulation (SSAs). In the late 1980s and early 1990s, he sought to use statistical methodology to conduct a rigorous test of this historical-institutional approach. His project involved the specification of four distinct yet comparable econometric models of the U.S. economy, based respectively on the neoclassical, the classical Marxian, the post-Keynesian, and his own Neo-Marxian "left-structuralist" perspective—the latter representing a formalization of the SSA approach. In a comparison of the four models' forecasting performance, Gordon reported that the left-structuralist model produced the lowest forecast errors.

During his last five years, Gordon focused on completing an analysis of the top-heavy bureaucratic structure of U.S. corporations and its relationship to the decline in the real wages of U.S. workers since the mid-1970s—two phenomena on which he had focused attention in his earlier work. This effort culminated in the publication of Fat and Mean: The Corporate Squeeze of Working Americans and the Myth of Managerial 'Downsizing' (1996) two months after his death. In this book, Gordon presented quantitative evidence challenging conventional views on U.S. corporate management and its relations with workers.

He argues that U.S. corporations have gone "mean" rather than "lean", employing more managers and supervisors per worker than ever before. He attributes the long-term squeeze on U.S. workers' real wages not so much to increasing international economic integration and increasingly complex technology as to corporate executives' choice of a "low-road" business strategy, involving the use of discipline and negative sanctions, rather than a "high-road" strategy, emphasizing positive incentives to motivate work. Gordon concluded the book with a chapter devoted to policy recommendations designed to promote more democratic and cooperative high-road approaches to labor management. Colleague Robert Pollin wrote about Gordon's theory, noting that "substantial productivity gains are attainable through operating a less hierarchical workplace and building strong democratic internal labor market institutions... through changing power relationships at the workplace and the decision-making process through which investment decisions get made, labor and the left can then also achieve a more egalitarian social structure of accumulation".

=== Death ===
Gordon died of congestive heart failure while waiting for a heart transplant in Manhattan, New York City, on 16 March 1996, aged 51.

== Works ==
- Gordon, David M. (1972). Theories of poverty and underemployment; orthodox, radical, and dual labor market perspectives. Lexington, Massachusetts: Lexington Books. ISBN 978-0-669-89268-0.
- Gordon, David M.; Reich, Michael; Edwards, Richard (1982). Segmented work, divided workers: the historical transformation of labor in the United States. New York: Cambridge University Press. ISBN 978-0-521-23721-5.
- Gordon, David M.; Bowles, Samuel; Weisskopf, Thomas E. (1983). Beyond the waste land: a democratic alternative to economic decline. Garden City, New York: Anchor Press/Doubleday. ISBN 978-0-385-18345-1.
  - Also as Gordon, David M.; Bowles, Samuel; Weisskopf, Thomas E. (1984). Beyond the wasteland: a democratic alternative to economic decline. London: Verso. ISBN 978-0-86091-823-3.
- Gordon, David M.; Bowles, Samuel; Weisskopf, Thomas E. (1990). After the waste land: a democratic economics for the year 2000. Armonk, New York: M. E. Sharpe, Inc. ISBN 978-0-87332-645-2.
- Gordon, David M. (1996). Fat and mean: the corporate squeeze of working Americans and the myth of managerial "downsizing". New York: Martin Kessler Books. ISBN 978-0-684-82288-4.
