= Quality bias =

Quality bias in price indices is a kind of mismeasurement if they do not incorporate data on the quality of goods from period to period, as well as their nominal price.

Personal computers are a canonical case. Because of improvements in computer chips, greater and greater speeds and features have become available, without substantial increases in price. If only price information on personal computers were used, quality bias would cause growth in a consumer price index (CPI) to be overestimated, since an equivalent computer would actually be much cheaper in later periods.

== Determining quality ==
Quality bias can work both ways. Faster computers with enhanced performance require greater memory and more expensive support software. Most personal computers were previously bundled with software, but now come only with a basic operating system and a requirement for the purchaser to purchase the bundled software after a "trial period", so the actual value per dollar is much lower. Obsolescence is built into most personal electronics, shortening their useful live, again lowering the actual value. All these issues make the quality bias tend to be negative rather than positive. As products and the manufacturing methodology advances, the cost of manufacture is expected to go down, and improved products are part of every product life cycle, and many products go through repeated cycling. An example is the automobile. Quality bias is most often seen in a negative manner in the cases of mature products as companies lower their acceptance standards in order to increase their profit margins. There is no effective measure for declining quality, unfortunately, which is why some nations such as Germany and Japan have developed very meticulous standards for nearly everything, including services. The DIN and JIS enable anyone to evaluate whether or not an article has been properly produced. There is no such standard in the U.S., except for some scattered attempts by insurers to control electrical quality (such as UL). Engineering standards, such as ASME and ASTM; Automotive, such as ASE and ISO are not effective standards and do not compare with JIS or DIN because it is self-imposed, self-regulated, and self-inspected by the very people it is designed to regulate.

Makers of price indexes can address the quality bias problem with several steps. The main approach is to use hedonic index methods to capture attributes of products and their implicit prices:

- Use matching models to relate goods from one period to the next
- Gather data on the attributes of goods and use hedonic regressions to infer implicit prices for these attributes and the net change in price for a good whose attributes have changed.
