= Michael Reich =

Polish-American economist (born 1945)

- Born: 18 October 1945 (age 80)

Academic background
- Education: Swarthmore College; Harvard University

Michael Reich (born 18 October 1945) is a Polish-born economist who primarily focuses on labor economics and political economy. Currently, Reich is a professor of economics and co-chair of the Center on Wage and Employment Dynamics at the Institute for Research on Labor and Employment (IRLE) at the University of California at Berkeley. He served as director of IRLE from 2004 to 2015. In 1968, he helped found the Union for Radical Political Economics.

== Early life and education ==
Reich was born in Trzebina, Poland, to Polish-Jewish parents who survived the Holocaust. The family moved to a Displaced Persons camp in Stuttgart, Germany in 1946 and emigrated to the United States in 1949, where Reich attended public schools in New York City, received a BA from Swarthmore College, majoring in mathematics, in 1966, and earned a Ph.D. in Economics from Harvard University in 1974.

Reich notes that he was a "child of the Sputnik age", thus he initially attended college with ambitions to become a physicist, focusing primarily in the fields of science and mathematics. His first publication, which appeared in Physical Review in 1964, arose from his work as a summer intern at the U.S. Naval Research Laboratory. Reich’s participation in the famous 1963 March on Washington for Freedom and Jobs led him to switch his interests from physics to economics.

In 1968, while in graduate school, Reich was a founding member of the Union for Radical Political Economics (URPE).

Reich contributed at least four articles to The Capitalist System, including a reprinting of "The Economics of Racism". Upon the book's release, the Journal of Economic Issues published a review of the book, summarizing it as "...a massive indictment of the contemporary American economic system. It is cast in Marxian terminology but stripped of some of Marx's turgidity and excess verbiage."

== Career ==
Early in Reich’s graduate career at Harvard, John Dunlop hired Reich to work on a study of anti-poverty programs in Boston. This project generated a vast literature on segmented labor markets, a term that Reich coined and that remains a recognized subfield in the Journal of Economic Literature’s classification scheme. Kenneth Arrow, who cited this work, agreed to supervise Reich’s dissertation, Racial Inequality and the White Income Distribution, along with Samuel Bowles.

In the 1960s and 1970s, Reich worked with David Gordon, Richard Edwards, and other well-known Marxist and Neo-Marxian economists. Focusing on labor economics, the group specifically narrowed in on segmented labor markets. In 1973, Reich, together with Edwards and Gordon, published A Theory of Labor Market Segmentation.

Reich was a teacher at Boston University for three years, and then in 1974 became an assistant professor of economics at the University of California at Berkeley. In 1989, he was promoted to full professor. According to Reich, he regularly taught courses at Berkeley in Marxist economics, political economy, and the history of economic thought.

Reich serves as director of the Institute for Research on Labor and Employment (IRLE) at UC Berkeley, and co-chairs IRLE's Center for Wage and Employment Dynamics (CWED). He has also served as editor of the publication Industrial Relations, of Berkeley's Institute of Industrial Relations.

In the late 1980s, Reich and his Berkeley Economics colleague Robert Anderson wrote a report showing that the University of California Retirement System’s multi-billion dollar investment portfolio over-weighted large companies, many of which did business in apartheid South Africa. The authors found that the retirement fund could both divest from these companies and improve its rate of return. The report served as the basis for their testimony at a UC Board of Regents hearing; UC began to divest the following year. In a 1990 speech at the Oakland Coliseum, Nelson Mandela cited UC Berkeley’s leadership as instrumental in ending apartheid.

Reich has produced research for the progressive public policy advocacy organization, the Center for American Progress. In 2010, he produced a report for the organization investigating the economic proposals of California gubernatorial candidate Meg Whitman. An economist at the Hoover Institution at Stanford University responded to Reich's report with evidence showing a negative effect of Reich's proposals.

On June 25, 2013, Reich testified before the United States Senate Committee on Health, Education, Labor and Pensions at a hearing discussing the 75th anniversary of the federal minimum wage. Reich testified in favor of a minimum wage increase, defending his reports against other contradicting research.

New York City, Seattle and Minnesota commissioned Reich and co-author James Parrott to study gig passenger driver pay and to recommend minimum pay standards, which were then adopted. Reich and Parrott have subsequently studied the effects of New York City’s policy.

== Research ==
Reich’s academic work has centered in two areas, Social Structures of Accumulation (SSAs) and Labor Economics. The SSA approach was first proposed in Reich’s 1982 book with Gordon and Edwards, and developed further in a series of volumes co-authored with David Kotz and Terence McDonough. SSA theory proposes that U.S. capitalism has evolved historically through a series of SSAs, or stages. Each stage contains a distinct set of labor institutions, industrial structures, financial institutions, international economics relations and different relations between the state and the economy. Each SSA lasts about 40 to 50 years and ends when vested interests increasingly retard economic growth. New SSAs arise after a period of experimentation with new institutions and when new multi-class political alliances champion successful growth strategies.

Reich’s early work on labor economics introduced the concept of segmented labor markets. His more recent work has focused on the economics of minimum wages. Reich and a series of co-authors and students have found that minimum wages have had largely benign effects. This research highlights the importance of imperfect competition in labor markets, which give employers the power to set wages below the level that would obtain if labor markets were perfectly competitive. Employers thereby profit, although at the cost of making their jobs less attractive. By reducing an employer’s wage-setting power, minimum wages increase the supply of workers to the employer, which keeps employment levels from falling.

== Honors ==
Reich was elected to Phi Beta Kappa and Sigma Xi when he was an undergraduate. In 1985 he was recognized as among the top 40 young economists in the U.S. Reich is widely cited in academic and policy circles. As of 2025, his work has been cited more than 20,000 times, according to Google Scholar. In 2017, Reich was awarded the Lifetime Achievement Award of the Labor and Employment Relations Association (LERA). In 2024, “Racial Inequality in Frictional Labor Markets,” which appeared in Labour Economics, received the best paper award from the European Association of Labor Economics.

== Selected publications ==
- “A Theory of Labor Market Segmentation” (co-authored), American Economic Review 1973.
- Labor Market Segmentation (DC Heath, co-edited, 1975), an early contribution to theories of dual labor markets.
- Racial Inequality: A Political-Economic Analysis (Princeton University Press, 1981), which analyzes structural causes of racial wage disparities.
- Segmented Work, Divided Workers: Historical Transformations of Labor in the United States (co-authored, Cambridge University Press, 1982).
- Social Structures of Accumulation: The Political Economy of Growth and Crisis (co-authored, Cambridge University Press, 1994).
- Work and Pay in the United States and Japan (co-authored, Oxford University Press, 1997).
- The Crisis of Contemporary Capitalism (co-authored and co-edited, Cambridge University Press, 2010).
- When Mandates Work: Raising Labor Standards at the Local Level (co-authored and co-edited, University of California Press, 2014).
- “Minimum Wage Shocks, Employment Flows, and Labor Market Frictions” (co-authored), Journal of Labor Economics 2016.
- “Can Labor Market Policies Reduce Deaths of Despair?” (co-authored), Journal of Health Economics.

== Controversy ==
In 2015, members of the Los Angeles City Council expressed concern with the selection of UC Berkeley’s Institute for Research on Labor and Employment (IRLE), to evaluate the city's proposed minimum wage policy, suggesting potential bias due to the Institute’s supposedly pro-labor reputation. These concerns confused two IRLE centers—Reich’s Center on Wage and Employment Dynamics (CWED), which conducts academic studies, and the Berkeley Labor Center. The City Council appointed an independent expert to compare Reich’s study for the Council with two independent studies; the expert concluded that Reich’s report was superior to the others.

Further scrutiny arose in 2016 and 2017, when internal emails obtained through public records requests revealed coordination between Reich’s team and advocacy organizations supporting minimum wage increases. Critics argued that this level of communication compromised the objectivity of the research. Reich responded that he was happy to share the results of his research with any interested parties. A 2017 Seattle Weekly report noted that the release of an IRLE study on Seattle’s minimum wage was timed to precede a separate University of Washington study that reached different conclusions. In response, Reich posted a statement on CWED’s website: he had already conducted his study when the City contacted him;he had simply agreed to move up its release date to the city’s celebration of the anniversary of the policy’s enactment.

In a 2024 interview with The New York Post, Reich emphasized that his studies are peer-reviewed and widely cited in academic literature, stating, “Our employment results are the same whether we use non-seasonally adjusted or seasonally adjusted data,” and that his work appears in “top academic refereed economics journals.” UC Berkeley’s IRLE also clarified that the Center on Wage and Employment Dynamics, which conducted many of these studies, does not receive union funding.

In a 2025 interview with the Berkeley Opportunity Lab, Reich stated that even in counties where the minimum wage rose to 80 percent of the median wage, “it did not have a negative effect on employment.” He also highlighted broader policy impacts, such as reductions in child poverty and suicide rates, which have been associated with higher minimum wages.
