= The Rise and Fall of American Growth =

2016 non-fiction book on economics

- Author: Robert J. Gordon
- Language: English
- Subject: Economics
- Publication place: United States
- ISBN: 9780691175805

The Rise and Fall of American Growth: The U.S. Standard of Living Since the Civil War is a non-fiction book by Robert J. Gordon, an American professor of economics at Northwestern University.

The book describes the 100 years following 1870 as the "Special Century", a time of exceptional growth and prosperity, which it claims has been flatlining since 1970, marked by growing inequality and insecure working conditions. Gordon considers that the apparent increasing economic growth since 1970 is just a faint echo of a great wave of economic growth between 1920 and 1970. The first half of the book discusses the change in the American standard of living pre-WW2, with the second half dedicated to the remainder of the 'special century' and the years post-1970.

The book was published in 2016 by Princeton University Press. It was a New York Times Bestseller, and shortlisted for the 2016 Financial Times and McKinsey Business Book of the Year Award.
