= Index (economics) =

Statistical measure of change

In economics, statistics, and finance, an index is a number that measures how a group of related data points—like prices, company performance, productivity, or employment—changes over time to track different aspects of economic health from various sources.

Consumer-focused indices include the Consumer Price Index (CPI), which shows how retail prices for goods and services shift in a fixed area, aiding adjustments to salaries, bond interest rates, and tax thresholds for inflation. The cost-of-living index (COLI) compares living expenses over time or across places. The Economist’s Big Mac Index uses a Big Mac's cost to explore currency values and purchasing power.

Market performance indices track trends like company value or employment. Stock market indices include the Dow Jones Industrial Average and S&P 500, which primarily cover U.S. firms. The Global Dow and NASDAQ Composite monitor major companies worldwide. Commodity indices track goods like oil or gold. Bond indices follow debt markets. Proprietary stock market index tools from brokerage houses offer specialized investment measures. Economy-wide, the GDP deflator, or real GDP, gauges price changes for all new, domestically produced goods and services.

== Index numbers ==
An index number is economic data figure that compares a value—like price or quantity—to a standard starting point, called the base value, which is usually set at 100. It's calculated as 100 times the ratio of the current value to the base—for example, if a commodity's price doubles from 1960 to 1970, its index number would be 200 with 1960 as the base. Index numbers help simplify complex data about business activity, cost of living, or employment into numbers that are easy to understand and compare over time.

Some index numbers, called superlative index numbers, are designed to closely approximate an ideal index based on an unknown utility function (how people value goods and services)—for example, the true cost-of-living index. While that ideal index relies on an uncalculable formula, superlative ones can be computed and provide a close match in many cases, such as for prices or quantities. Economists study how to build these numbers, what makes them useful, and how they connect to economic ideas, often measuring shifts in prices, wages, or production against a base of 100.

Some indices are not time series—like spatial indices, which compare things like real estate prices or service availability across geographic locations, or indices comparing distributions of data within categories, such as purchasing power parity for currencies.

=== Index number problem ===
The index number problem is a challenge in economics where statistical indices struggle to perfectly measure economic changes, such as increases in the cost of living with tools like the Consumer Price Index (CPI). It arises because indices rely on fixed assumptions—like a set basket of goods in the CPI—that may not match real-world shifts in spending, production, or preferences, leading to inaccuracies in tracking inflation or other trends.

This limitation affects various indices. The CPI can overstate or understate living costs if consumers switch to cheaper goods when prices rise, a flaw called substitution bias. The Producer Price Index (PPI) might miss shifts in production costs or quality improvements in goods. The GDP deflator can skew real output by not fully adjusting for new products or price variations. There's no perfect solution, as ideal indices require complete data on preferences or market conditions, which is impractical. In practice, baskets or weights are updated periodically, but long-term comparisons remain inexact.

== See also ==
- Stock market index
- List of stock market indices
- Producer price index
- Price index
- Chemical plant cost indexes
- Bureau of Labor Statistics
- Dow Jones Indexes
- Indexation
- Economic indicator
