= K. L. Krishna =

Indian econometrician and professor

KL Krishna
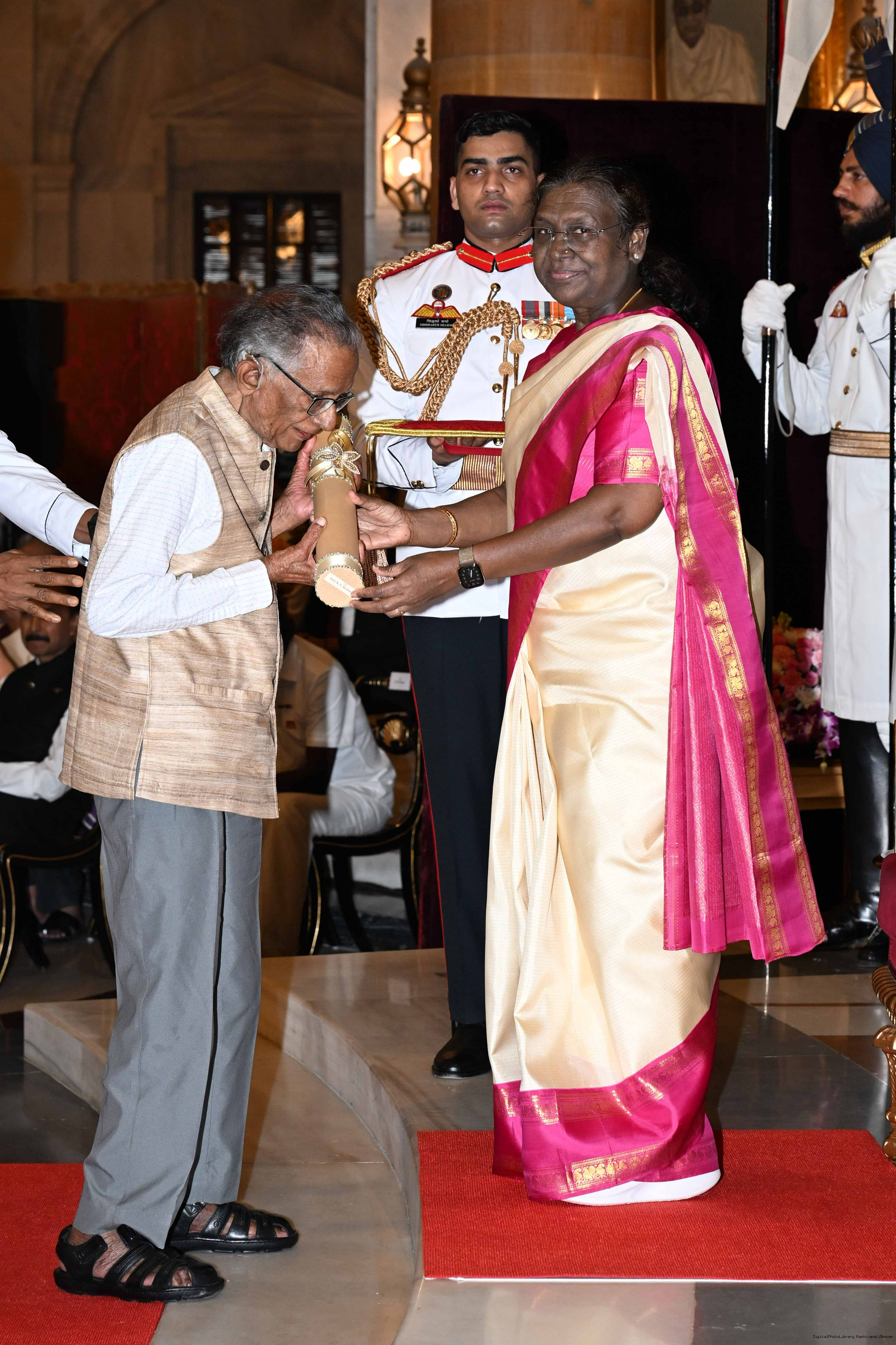
- KL Krishna receiving the Padma Shri award from the President of India
- Born: 16 August 1935 (age 91); Andhra Pradesh, India
- Citizenship: Indian
- Occupations: Economist, statistician, econometrician

Academic background
- Education: Andhra University (BSc) (MSc) University of Kerala (PhD) The University of Chicago
- Doctoral advisor: Zvi Griliches
- Awards: Padma Shri

Kosaraju Leela Krishna, also known as KL Krishna (born 16 August 1935), is an eminent Indian economist, statistician and former professor who is known for his significant contributions in the field of econometrics. He received the Padma Shri award from the president of India in May 2025.

== Early life and education ==
Krishna was born on 12 August 1935 in Andhra Pradesh, India. He completed his Bsc in mathematics from Andhra University and his Msc in statistics from the University of Kerala. He then went to the United States as a Fulbright Scholar to complete his PhD in economics from the University of Chicago under Zvi Griliches. Krishna has also received training from the Indian statistician C. R. Rao at the Indian Statistical Institute.

== Career ==
Krishna was Professor and Head of the Department the Delhi School of Economics.

== Awards ==
- Padma Shri (2025)
