= Robert Aaron Gordon =

American economist

R. Aaron Gordon
- Born: Aaron Goldstein; July 26, 1908; Washington, DC
- Died: April 7, 1978 (aged 69); Berkeley, California
- Spouse: Margaret Gordon

Academic background
- Education: Harvard University; Johns Hopkins University

Academic work
- Discipline: Macroeconomics
- School or tradition: Keynesian
- Institutions: University of California, Berkeley

Robert Aaron Gordon (born Aaron Goldstein; July 26, 1908 – April 7, 1978) was an American economist. He was a professor of economics at the University of California, Berkeley from 1938 to 1976. In 1975, he served as president of the American Economic Association.

He was married to economist Margaret Gordon (1910–94). Both of their sons, Robert J. Gordon and David M. Gordon, became notable economists as well.

In 1959, with funding from the Ford Foundation, Gordon and James Edwin Howell published Higher Education for Business, later known as the Gordon-Howell report. It is considered a key event in the history of business management and its development as a profession. The report gave detailed recommendations for treating management as a science and improving the academic quality of business schools. The next thirty years are sometimes referred to as a "Golden Age" in which quantitative social science research became an established part of business schools.
