= Stigler Commission =

US government commission

The Stigler Commission, formally known as the Price Statistics Review Committee, was convened in 1961 to study the measurement of inflation in the United States. Headed by economist George Stigler, its mandate was to conduct research into all types of price indices, including the Consumer Price Index (CPI). Based on its recommendations, the Bureau of Labor Statistics established a price research division.

The next major commission like it was the Boskin Commission in 1996, which was solely focused on evaluating the CPI.

The Stigler Commission's work was cited for decades after for "its important input." It was remembered as having "produce[d] substantial original research," for which Congress didn't have the resources. In 1998, Alan Greenspan called its work "all the whole analysis" for its comprehensive review.

== See also ==
- Inflation
