= Thomas E. Weisskopf =

Thomas E. Weisskopf (born April 13, 1940) is an American political economist and professor emeritus of Economics and in the Residential College at the University of Michigan. He is a founder and has been a contributor to the Union for Radical Political Economics (URPE). His work focuses on development economics, macroeconomic performance in capitalist economies, the political economy of socialist transition, comparative studies of discrimination and affirmative action, and the analysis of economic inequality.

== Early life and education ==
Weisskopf was born on April 13, 1940, in Rochester, New York. He is the son of theoretical physicist Victor Weisskopf.

His early education included public schooling in Arlington, Massachusetts, two years at the Shady Hill School in Cambridge, Massachusetts, and a final three years at Phillips Exeter Academy in Exeter, New Hampshire. He earned a B.A. (summa cum laude) in Economics from Harvard University in 1961, where he was elected president of WHRB. His senior honors thesis examined price movements in U.S. manufacturing. Weisskopf then enrolled in the graduate economics program at the Massachusetts Institute of Technology, where he completed his Ph.D. in Economics in 1966, writing a dissertation titled A Programming Model for Import Substitution in India.

== Career ==
Weisskopf’s academic career began with teaching and research positions at the Indian Statistical Institute. Between 1961 and 1968 he spent four years working there as a teacher and researcher, first at its Kolkata headquarters in 1961-62 and then in its New Delhi branch in 1964-65 and 1966-68. His 1964-65 stint was supported by a junior fellowship from the American Institute of Indian Studies, and his last two years were made possible by a Ford Foundation grant. He returned to the United States in 1968 and served as Assistant Professor of Economics at Harvard University before joining the University of Michigan with a tenured appointment in 1972.

At Michigan, Weisskopf progressed from associate professor (1972–1979) to full Professor of Economics (1979–2010), also holding a parallel appointment in the Residential College. He served as Director of the Residential College from 1996 to 2001 and again from 2002 to 2005, playing a key role in the College’s programmatic and curricular development. In 2006–2007 he was Resident Director of the Academic Program in Aix-en-Provence operated jointly by the Universities of Wisconsin, Indiana, and Michigan. He retired as Professor Emeritus in 2010.

== Research and scholarly works ==
His early scholarship focused on the dynamics of development, trade, and structural transformation in India. Drawing on fieldwork in the 1960s, he analyzed patterns of industrialization, import substitution, and institutional constraints in emerging economies.

From the late 1970s to the 1980s, Weisskopf examined productivity trends, profitability crises, and macroeconomic instability in capitalist economies. Working within neo-Marxian and heterodox traditions, he contributed to debates on stagnation, technological change, and the distribution of economic power.

In the 1990s, he turned to the political economy of the former socialist states of Eastern Europe, with an emphasis on Russia. His work assessed how privatization, institutional restructuring, and political change shaped transitional outcomes.

Weisskopf’s later research focuses with affirmative action policies in the United States and India. His 2004 book, Affirmative Action in the United States and India: A Comparative Perspective, offered a landmark cross-national analysis of discrimination, representation, and equity policies. He also wrote on rising wealth and income inequality, providing commentary on the structural drivers of global economic disparities.

== Selected publications ==
- MacEwan, Arthur; Weisskopf, Thomas E. (1973). Perspectives on the Economic Problem: A Book of Readings in Political Economy. Prentice-Hall. ISBN 978-0-13-660928-5.
- Chenery, Hollis Burnley; Bowles, Samuel (1971). Studies in development planning. Harvard economic studies. Cambridge: Harvard University Press. ISBN 978-0-674-84725-5.
- Minhas, Bagicha Singh; Parikh, Kirit S.; Srinvasan, T. N. (1972). Scheduling the Operations of the Bhakra System: Studies in Technical and Economic Evaluation. Statistical Pub. Society.
- Edwards, Richard; Reich, Michael; Weisskopf, Thomas E. (1978). The Capitalist System: A Radical Analysis of American Society. Prentice-Hall. ISBN 978-0-13-113597-0.
- Bowles, Samuel; Gordon, David M.; Weisskopf, Thomas E. (1983). Beyond the Waste Land: A Democratic Alternative to Economic Decline. Anchor Press/Doubleday. ISBN 978-0-385-18345-1.
- Bowles, Samuel; Gordon, David M.; Weisskopf, Thomas E. (1990). After the Waste Land: A Democratic Economics for the Year 2000. M.E. Sharpe. ISBN 978-0-87332-645-2.
- Weisskopf, Thomas E. (2004-01-22). Affirmative Action in the United States and India: A Comparative Perspective. Routledge. ISBN 978-1-135-99730-4.
