= G. S. Maddala =

American economist

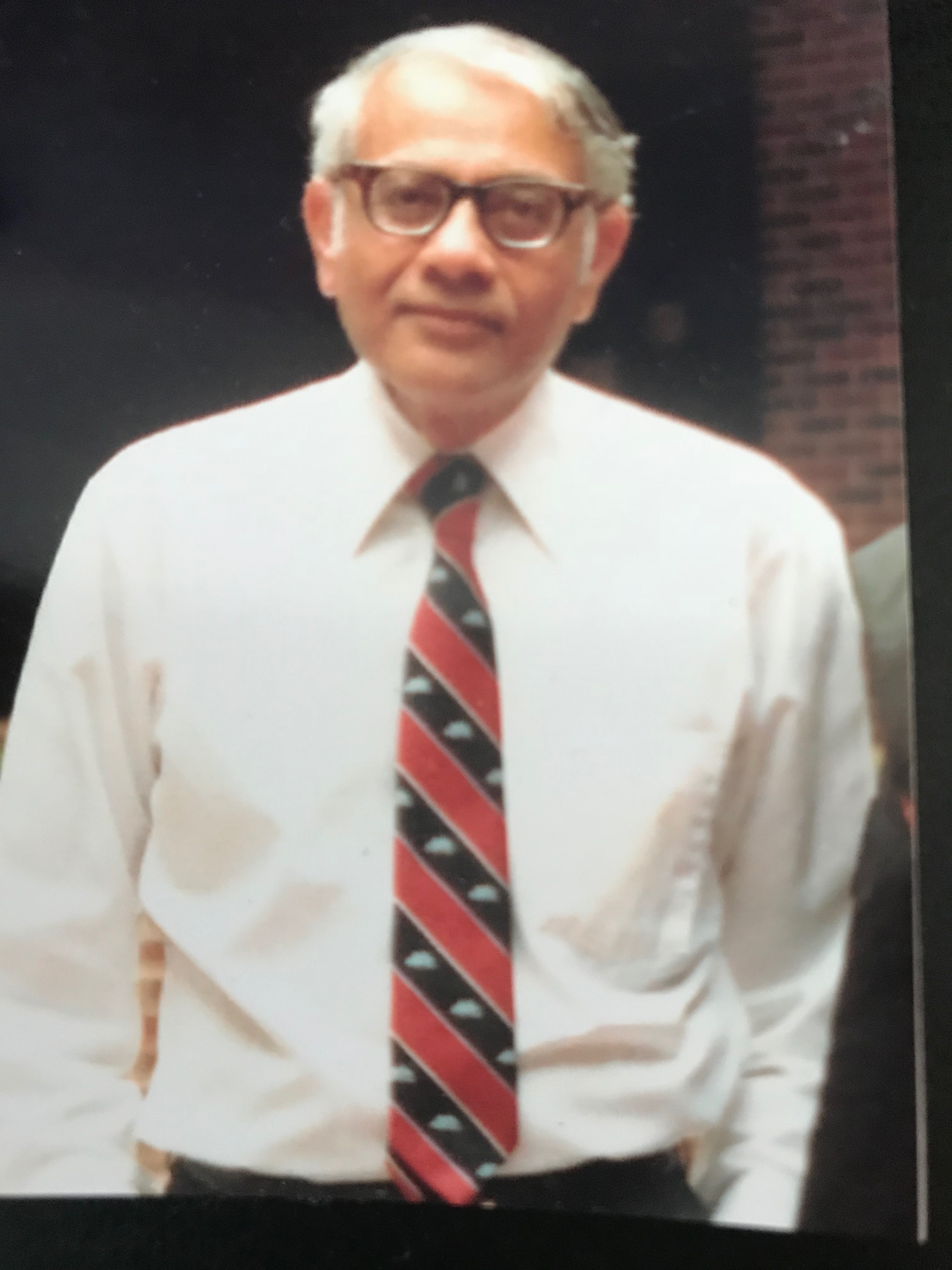
- GS Maddala (unknown date)
- Born: 21 May 1933; Andhra Pradesh, India
- Died: 4 June 1999 (aged 66); Columbus, Ohio, U.S.
- Education: University of Chicago Ph.D. 1963; Bombay University M.A. Andhra University B.A.
- Known for: Theoretical and applied econometrics
- Scientific career
- Fields: Econometrics
- Workplaces: Ohio State University 1994-99; University of Florida 1975-93; University of Rochester 1967-75; Stanford University 1963-67
- Doctoral advisor: Zvi Griliches

Gangadharrao Soundalyarao "G. S." Maddala (21 May 1933 – 4 June 1999) was an Indian American economist, mathematician, and teacher, known for his contributions in the field of econometrics and for the textbooks he authored in this field.

== Biography and education ==
He was "born in India to a family of very modest means."

He obtained a B.A. in mathematics from Andhra University and, in 1957, an M.A. in statistics from Bombay University.

He came to the United States as a Fulbright Scholar to the Economics department of the University of Chicago.

In 1963, he completed his Ph.D. in the Department of Economics at the University of Chicago with a dissertation written under the supervision of Zvi Griliches.

== Teaching and research career ==
Maddala's first faculty position was at Stanford University.

He held the university eminent scholar position at Ohio State University upon his death; previous university affiliations included Stanford University (1963–1967), University of Rochester (1967–1975), and the University of Florida (1975–1993).

Maddala published over 110 scholarly papers and wrote 12 books covering most of the emerging areas of econometrics. His 1983 book titled Limited Dependent and Qualitative Variables in Econometrics is now regarded as a classic and seminal text for advanced studies in econometrics.

In econometrics methodology, Maddala's key areas of research and exposition included distributed lags, generalized least squares, panel data, simultaneous equations, errors in variables, income distribution, switching regressions, disequilibrium models, qualitative and limited dependent variable models, self-selection models, outliers and bootstrap methods, unit roots and cointegration methods, and Bayesian econometrics. In empirical economics, Maddala contributed to the areas of consumption, production and cost functions, money demand, regulation, pseudo-data, returns to college education, housing market discrimination, survey data on expectations, and risk premia in future markets.

== Selected publications ==
- ____ (1983). Limited Dependent and Qualitative Variables in Econometrics, Cambridge. Description, and preview.
- ____ (1992). Introduction to Econometrics, 2nd ed., Macmillan.

== Memorials and tributes ==
The G. S. Maddala Memorial Fund, at Ohio State University, was created in 2004, by Dr. Maddala's wife Kameswari "Kay" and his colleagues and students. It provides awards "to graduate students for excellence in quantitative research using econometrics, both theoretical and applied" and sponsors distinguished speakers.
