= Hedonic regression =

Method for estimating demand or value

In economics, hedonic regression, also sometimes called hedonic demand theory, is a revealed preference method for estimating demand or value of a characteristic of a differentiated good. It decomposes the item being researched into its constituent characteristics and obtains estimates of the contributory value for each. This requires that the composite good (the item being researched and valued) can be reduced to its constituent parts and that those resulting parts are in some way valued by the market. Hedonic models are most commonly estimated using regression analysis, although some more generalized models such as sales adjustment grids are special cases which do not.

Hedonic models are commonly used in real estate appraisal, real estate economics, environmental economics, marketing research, and Consumer Price Index (CPI) calculations. For example, in real estate economics, a hedonic model might be used to estimate demand or willingness to pay for a housing characteristic such as the size of the home or number of bedrooms. In environmental applications, hedonic models are often used to estimate the capitalization of environmental amenities into home prices by estimating the impact of a nearby amenity (such as a park) on home prices, holding other housing characteristics fixed. In CPI calculations, hedonic regression is used to control the effect of changes in product quality. In marketing research, hedonic models can determine brand‐name effects on prices and quantify the incremental value added to a product by its brand name. Price changes that are due to substitution effects are subject to hedonic quality adjustments.

== Hedonic models and real estate valuation ==
In real estate economics, Hedonic regression is used to adjust for the issues associated with researching a good that is as heterogeneous, such as buildings. Because individual buildings are so different, it is difficult to estimate the demand for buildings generically. Instead, it is assumed that a house can be decomposed into characteristics such as its amount of bedrooms, the size of its lot, or its distance from the city center. A hedonic regression equation treats these attributes (or bundles of attributes) separately, and estimates prices (in the case of an additive model) or elasticity (in the case of a log model) for each of them. This information can be used to construct a price index that can be used to compare the price of housing in different cities or to do time series analysis. As with CPI calculations, Hedonic pricing can be used to:

- Correct for quality changes in constructing a housing price index.
- Assess the value of a property, in the absence of specific market transaction data.
- To analyze the demand for various housing characteristics, as well as housing demand in general.

Due to the macro-oriented nature of hedonic models, with regard to their more general approach to assessment when compared to the more exacting and specific (albeit less contextualized) approach of individual assessment, when used for mass appraisal, the Uniform Standards of Professional Appraisal Practice, or USPAP, has established mass appraisal standards to govern the use of hedonic regressions and other automated valuation models when used for real estate appraisal.

== Hedonic models outside of real estate valuation ==
Aside from its use in housing market estimations, Hedonic regression has also seen use as a means for testing assumptions in spatial economics, and is commonly applied to operations in tax assessment, litigation, academic studies, and other mass appraisal projects.

Appraisal methodology more or less treats hedonic regression as a more statistically robust form of the sales comparison approach, making it a popular means for assessment in any market or economic sector in which valuation between two categorically similar (or same) goods (such as two different kitchenware sets) can differ greatly based on additional factors (such as whether the pots and pans made of copper, cast iron, stone, etc, or what non-stick coating, if any, was applied) or constituent goods (including a steamer basket for one of the pots or having the largest pot be a Dutch oven) that strongly influence or semi-exclusively determine the unified good's value.

== History ==
Hedonic modeling was first published in the 1920s as a method for valuing the demand and the price of farm land. However, the history of hedonic regression traces its roots to Court (1939), which was an analysis of automobile prices and automobile features. Hedonic regression is presently used for creating the Consumer Price Index (CPI).

== Criticisms of hedonic models ==
Some commentators, including Austrian economists, have criticized the US government's use of hedonic regression in computing its CPI, fearing it can be used to mask the "true" inflation rate and thus lower the interest it must pay on Treasury Inflation-Protected Securities (TIPS) and Social Security cost of living adjustments.

The same use of hedonic models when analyzing consumer prices in other countries, however, has shown that non-hedonic methods may themselves misstate inflation over time by failing to take quality changes into account.

== See also ==
- Hedonic index
- Compensating differential
- Kelvin Lancaster
- Dynamic pricing
