= Wage growth =

Rise of wage adjusted for inflation

Wage growth is a trend of increases in wages, in contrast to wage stagnation. Real wage growth is an increase in wages adjusted for inflation, while nominal wage growth is not adjusted. It is often expressed as an annual percentage increase. In macroeconomics, wage growth is one of the main measures of long-term economic growth, since it reflects the consumer's purchasing power in the economy as well as the level of living standards. Positive wage growth (in nominal terms, i.e. unadjusted) is often accompanied by price inflation, while low wage growth may be accompanied by deflation, which a government may seek to address through fiscal policy. Minimum wages may be introduced; these will usually increase the average wage growth, at the cost of stimulating price inflation.

Weak productivity is likely to result in low long-term wage growth. In the shorter term, low wage growth may be caused by spare capacity in the Labour Market, which is likely to result in less competitiveness among the workers. To achieve consistent strong wage growth and sustainable economic growth, high productivity is needed. Higher labour productivity (measured by GDP per worker) can result in higher real wage growth.

== Overview ==
A consistent trend of real wage growth began in the 19th century, when the Industrial Revolution started a trend of technological improvements, often resulting in improved productivity.

In recent years, real wage growth has tended to be less, perhaps due to the 2008 financial crisis and perhaps because, as Robert Solow implied, greater dependence on technology is sometimes counterproductive. Many countries are still experiencing low wage growth rates. The International Labour Organization reported that global wage growth has been slowing down, reducing to 2.4 per cent in 2016 and 1.8 per cent in 2017. The organization claimed that in spite of the recently increased investment in capital, the weak labour productivity has been the main issue that contributes to the current sluggish GDP, resulting in the low wage growth. Generally, low productivity growth and increased global competition have been identified as reasons for the recent slow wage growth, which prevents actually sustainable economic growth. The Economic Policy Institute reports that the current sluggish wage growth and lower labour productivity are driven by the abandonment of full employment, as more flexible employment styles have become accepted due to the significant progress in automation, technological change and increasing global production integration. Lower labour productivity results in a weak investment into capitals describing the lower total factor productivity growth. Businesses often attempt to increase their efficiency (known as multifactor productivity) by increasing their shares into capitals, however, the economic impacts contribute to the employers while the employees experience fewer impacts from the investment. Wage growth is not necessarily impacted by fluctuations in unemployment rates however, it depends on how the wage growth is measured in calculations.

=== Arguments ===
- The unemployment rate does not necessarily indicate the conditions of wage growth as it does not demonstrate accurate availability of jobs opportunities in the labour market. For example, the United States achieved full employment while experiencing low wage growth.
- High wage growth does not represent high living standards assuming that the cost of living is high.
- Inflation might not be affected by a high wage growth if profits go to the compensation for wages where they should be used to increase labour productivity.

== Measurement ==
Wage growth can be calculated in multiple ways. The measuring is often conducted by either from the producer perspective or from the consumer perspective. While the producers calculate their labour costs relative to the output price (real producer wage) while the consumers calculate their wage associated with market prices (real consumer wage). The examples include

- Which workers to include in the calculation... Employees this year might not be in the labour market next year or changed to different jobs. This method doesn't show accurate data of wage growth of the people as it is unclear if the wage has become higher or different people have joined in the labour market.
- Calculating low-paid and high-paid workers equally... Although it estimates the living standards of an average worker, it is hard to determine the real wage growth due to the possible correlation with the inflation rate.
- Calculate the Wholesale price index (WPI) deflated by Consumer price index (CPI)... This calculates the consumer perspective of wage growth as it observes the price inflation.

Most of the countries examine their wage growths by adjusting the growth with respect to inflation, and this estimates real wage growth. In Australia, a gross monthly wage is used to calculate the real wage growth, adjusting relative to inflation as its variations reflect both hourly wages and the average number of hours worked.

== Trends ==
=== Australia ===
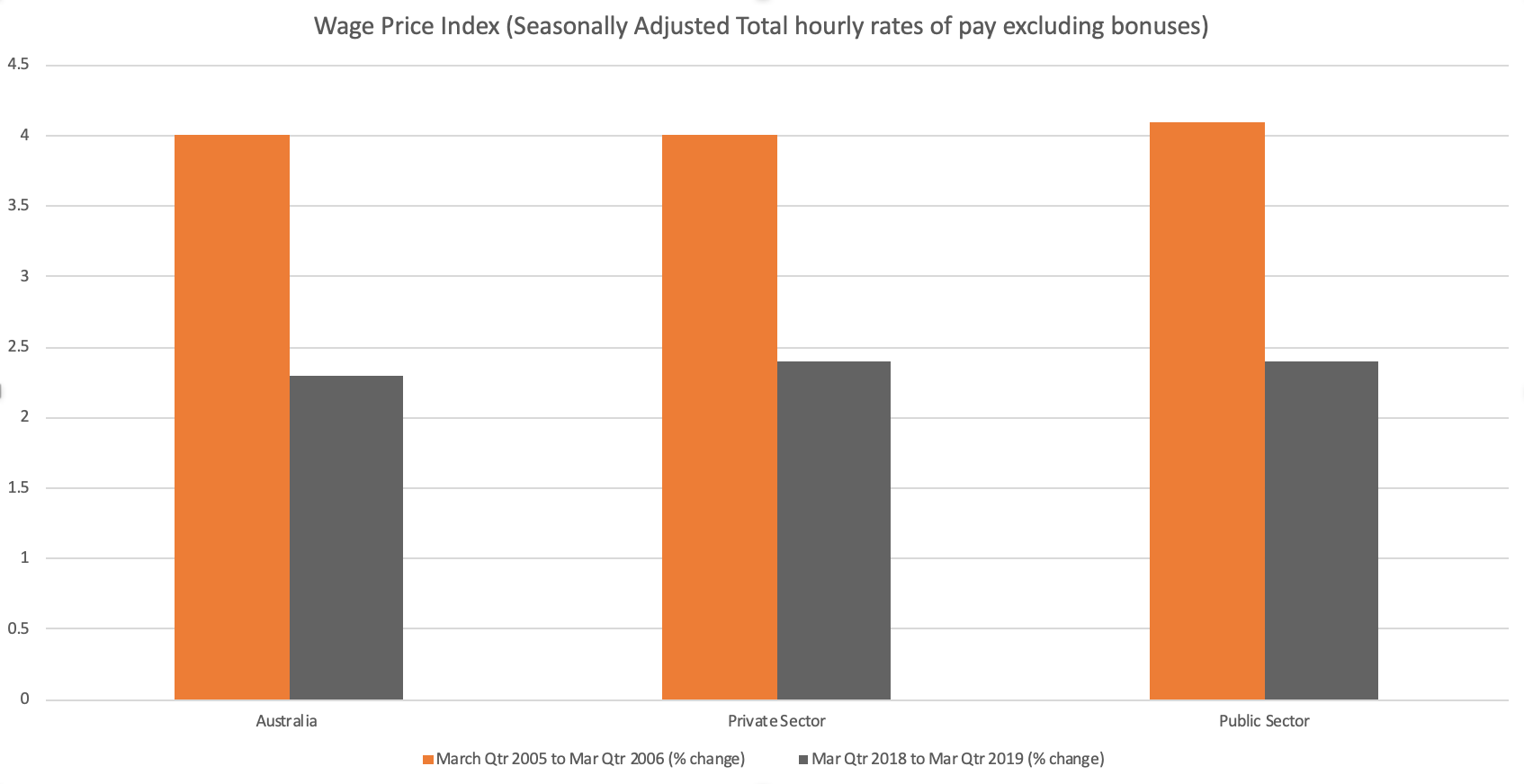
This chart illustrates the wage growth of Australia in both public and private sectors comparing pre-GFC and post-GFC obtained data from the Australian Bureau of Statistics. It demonstrates the significant decline in wage growth after the GFC in both sectors in Australia.

Despite the growing labour productivity in the recent five years, Australia has been experiencing stagnated wage growth in both the public and private sectors along with the global low-wage growth compared to the data in pre-GFC. The Treasury Australia argues that the recent flexible work style has contributed to the recent stagnated wage growth. As a result of increasing jobs in the service industries, more employment in part-time and non-routine jobs were created that affected the labour share of income. The Household Income and Labour Dynamics in Australian survey (HILDA) stated, "workers with a university education had higher wage growth than those with no post-school education over the period 2005–2010, but have since experienced lower wage growth than individuals with no post-school education." This can be explained as the introduction of minimum wage law not only creates slow growth in creating low-skilled jobs but also reduces the wage growth for high-paid workers due to the compensation for paying increased the minimum wages for the low-paid workers.

=== United Kingdom ===
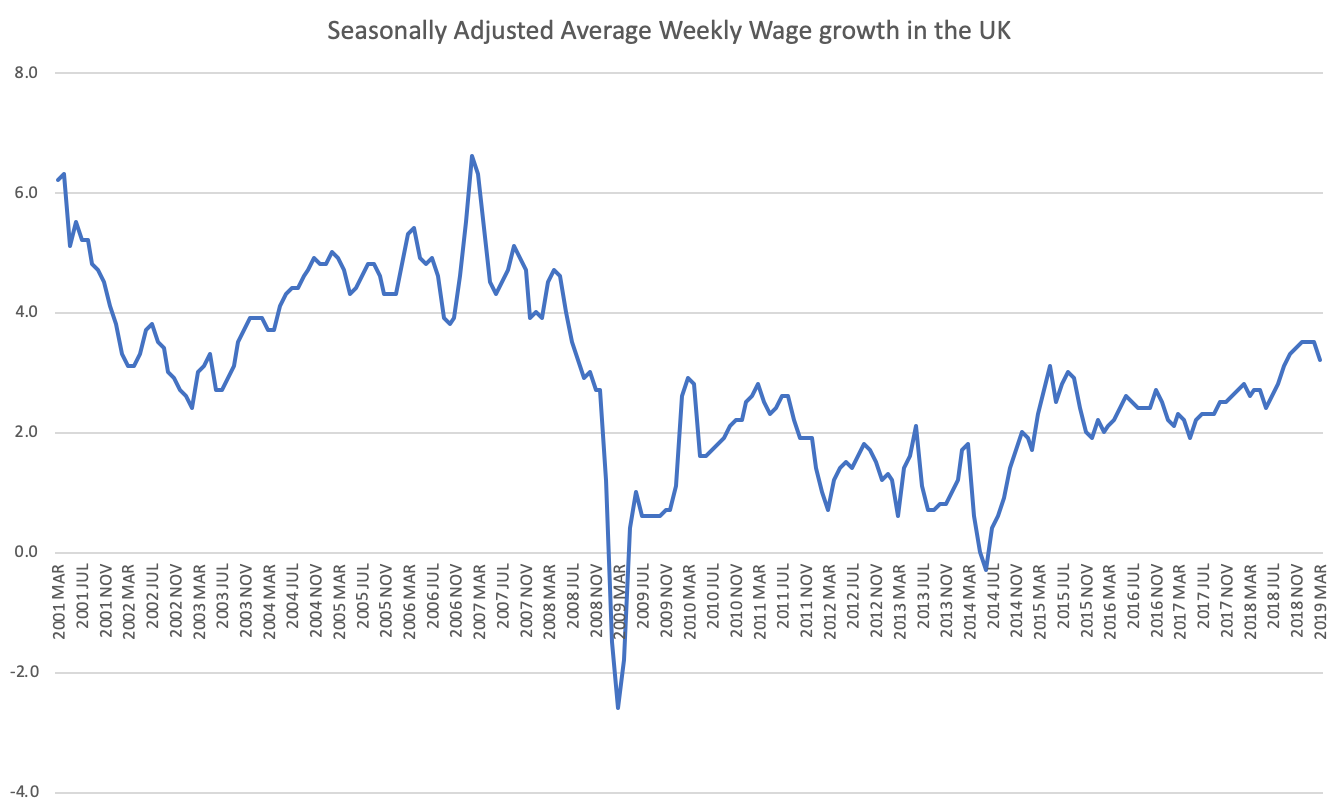
This graph demonstrates seasonally Adjusted Average Weekly Wage Growth in the UK, which data obtained data from the Office for National Statistics

Like the other advanced countries, the United Kingdom had the record low wage growth of −2.60 per cent in 2009 from the GFC, yet the wage growth has been slowly improving in recent years and has recovered to 3.5 per cent in 2019. However, Britain is one of the worst countries with weak wage growth over the past decade compared to other OECD countries since the unemployment rates do not meet with the appropriate wage growth, calculated based on Phillips curve. In fact, 4 per cent of unemployment rate reflected a 5 per cent rise of wage growth in the 1980s despite the 2.9 per cent in 2018 with the same unemployment rate.

With the low unemployment rates, one of the factors for the recent rise in wage growth includes more employment of disabled people and people in high skilled occupations, constructing a strong labour market. By bringing more people into the workforce in high-paid occupations, it produces more competitiveness in the workforce resulting in the creation of higher labour productivity hence a high wage growth. Since self-employment has increased its employment by 15% in 2017, more flexibility in employment, entrepreneurship and more labour participation became available to workers. However, since the weakness of self-employment produces relatively less labour productivity compared to bigger businesses, it could also contribute to the weak wage growth so that fiscal policies to secure the growth need to be conducted for long-term growth.

Additionally, an unequal wage growth exits in Britain since the wage growth of highest-earning of 10 per cent employee jobs has increased more than the average wage growth in 2018. This is because more part-time jobs in high-paid occupations such as managers became available to workers. The employees in the fifth percentile (the bottom of the income distribution) have been experiencing the smallest growth by 0.8% due to the increased employment in 16 and 17-year-olds who get paid the national minimum wage of 4.20 pounds whereas people aged 25 years and older get 7.83 pounds.

=== United States ===
Due to the 2008 financial crisis, the United States also experienced a significant decline in wage growth like the other advanced countries. Despite the major recovery after the GFC, wage growth in the United States has failed to reach the growth achieved in pre-GFC and has been stagnated for a recent decade. Like the weak wage growth in Australia, the United States is also experiencing a struggle because of the recent significant development in globalisation and automation where the competition with lower-paid workers overseas and robots was created. The United States is one of the few countries that has been experiencing weak wage growth while achieving low unemployment rates as it has been significantly low for nearly two decades. One of the factors is because of the limiting official definition of unemployment as it leaves out students and people that are not looking for work but willing to work if there are job opportunities. Studies found that 70% of the people who are getting employed had not been included in the unemployed category. To achieve high wage growth in the United States, it depends on how the businesses creates competitiveness in labour market and encourage those people to work for the purpose of boosting high labour productivity to result in high wage growth.

Although minimum wage law has been applied in many states to increase wage growth, this has not been an effective solution to improve the growth due to the increasing living costs. Also, the unequal wage growth in the income distributions is identified as one of the major reasons of the weak wage growth in the United States. Despite a slight rise in real wage among low-income earners due to the minimum wage law, the wage growth is mostly contributed to the high income-earners. Since 2000, 3 per cent of wage growth identified in the lowest tenth of the income distribution compared to the 15.7 per cent in the top tenth. Other factors that contribute to the current sluggish weak wage growth include the decline of labor unions, poor educational attainment and lack of competitiveness in the labour market. The decline of labour unions and the emergence of big corporations made difficulties for workers to negotiate for a higher wage. This created a lower productivity growth causing the weak wage growth.

There is also an unequal wage growth in race and gender. Due to the emergence of educated women (on bachelor level or higher) in the labour force, the real wage growth in male have been decreasing since 1979. As a result, the wage growth gap depending on the education levels has widened than years past. The unequal wage growth gap is also identified in race since the real wage growth of Caucasian males are the highest compared to any races of men or women. In contrast, African-American workers have been experiencing the smallest wage growth.

== See also ==
- Microeconomics
- Median income
- Unemployment rate
- Real wages
