= Food inflation in India =

Increase of food prices in India

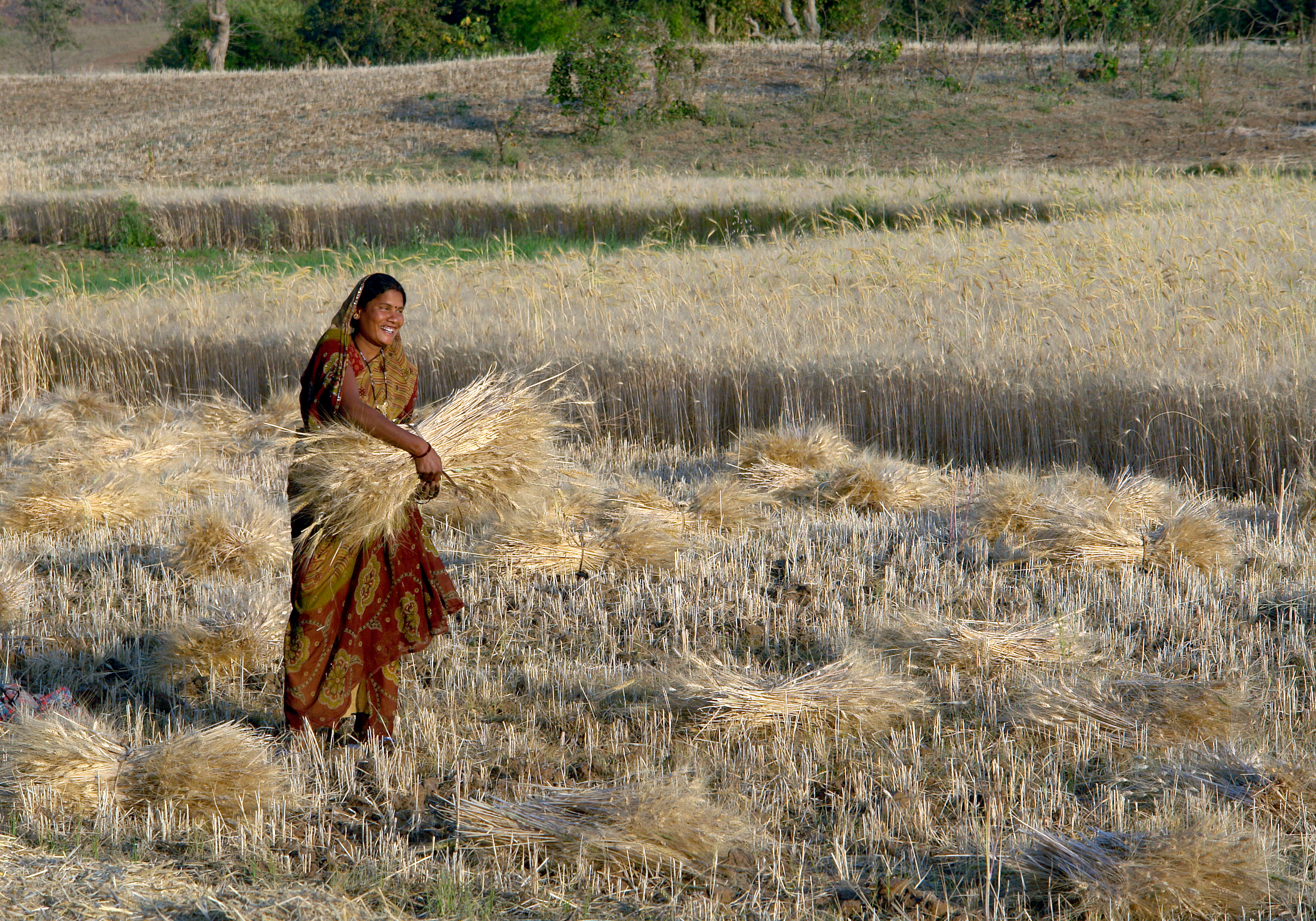
Wheat production by an Indian woman - a symbol of food security

Food inflation in India has been a significant economic concern since the 2000s. Food inflation, the increase in prices of food commodities over time, a part of inflation in India, has significantly affected the living conditions of the majority of the Indian population, especially the lower-income groups.

A study shows that these lower-income groups spend more than 66% of their income on food, and the average share is 58–59%.

The rise in food prices is calculated using the Wholesale Price Index (WPI) for primary (cereals, pulses, fruits, and vegetables) and manufactured (sugar and dairy products) food products or the Consumer Price Index. The Highest food Inflation periods were recorded in 2006–2013, when it increased on average by more than 10%. It is primarily driven by both global and domestic factors such as drought-induced shortages in food supply, an increase in agricultural wages, and rising international prices. In 2010, food inflation meant Indian consumers spent approximately 20% more compared to the previous year to maintain the consumption level. However, a bulk of Indian households could not afford to increase their food expenditure to compensate for the increasing prices.

In addition to economic implications, food inflation in India has far-reaching consequences for public health, nutrition, and social equity. Increasing prices of essential food items have disproportionately impacted low-income and vulnerable populations, contributing to rising rates of nutritional insecurity. Rural and urban populations experience food inflation differently, with rural landless laborers facing greater hardship due to their lower purchasing power and seasonal incomes. The phenomenon also has gendered effects, as women and children tend to bear the brunt of reduced food intake, while men, being the main providers of the family, consume more food. Therefore, during periods of food inflation, women and children are more likely to suffer from anaemia and undernutrition due to limited food allocated to them.

== Background ==
=== Measuring food inflation in India ===
Wholesale Price Index (WPI) refers to the average selling price in the wholesale market received by domestic producers of goods. On the other hand, Consumer Price Index refers to the average selling prices from the consumer's perspective. CPI and WPI can vary due to taxes, subsidies, and distribution costs. Historically, food Inflation in India has been measured and analysed using the Wholesale Price Index (WPI) because of its availability. India did not have a unified Consumer Price Index (CPI) for both urban and rural areas before January 2011 with base year of 2010. The Reserve Bank of India officially adopted CPI as the key measure of food inflation in February 2015 following the recommendations of Patel Committee Report.

In practice, the Wholesale Price Index in India represents prices from various stages of the value chain. According to National Statistical Commission, WPI may correspond to farm-gate, factory-gate or mine-head prices, or in different cases, primary and secondary markets, or at various wholesale and retail levels. WPI measures food inflation based on the weighted average of primary food products and manufactured food products. The WPI basket, based on the 2004–2005 base year, consisted of 676 commodities such as fuel(15%), metals(10.7%), chemicals(12%), textiles(7.3%), and food items(24.3%). Within this basket, primary food products—including cereals, pulses, milk, meat, fruits, and vegetables—accounted for 14.3% of the total weight, while manufactured food products like butter, ghee, milk powder, bakery goods, and sugar held a weight of 10%, bringing the total weight of food items to 24.3%.

In Addition to WPI, four Consumer Price Indices were officially published in India for different segments of the economy. These included the CPI for Industrial Workers (CPI-IW, base year 2001), Agricultural Labourers (CPI-AL, base year 1986–87), Rural Labourers (CPI-RL, base year 1986–87), and Urban Non-Manual Employees (CPI-UNME, base year 2001). The CPI for food was under the CPI for Industrial Workers (CPI-IW), which comprised six main components - food, clothing, fuel and lighting, housing, tobacco and intoxicants, and miscellaneous. A significant difference between WPI and CPI was that CPI assigned a much larger share of weight to food, ranging from 49 to 65% compared to WPI 41-59%, within their food index.

=== Historical trends ===
==== Overall trends ====
From 1994–1995 to 2004–2005, the average rate of food inflation according to WPI (base year 1993–1994) was about 6% annually. During this period, food inflation was recorded as relatively moderate, ranging from 4% to 7.5% for most food items. The lowest inflation rate was observed in sugar, while the highest rate was recorded in fruits and vegetables.

After 2005, the prices of food began increasing more sharply, leading to a spike in 2008 after global and domestic food commodity prices surged. During the same period, prices of non-food items declined by 1.76% between 2008 and 2009, while food prices increased by more than 12%. In January 2010, wholesale food inflation neared 20%. On average, from 2006 to 2009, food inflation was over 80% higher than inflation in non-food commodities. This marked a reversal from the 1993–2004 trend, when food prices had increased more slowly than non-food prices.

Between 2009–2010 and 2010–2011, food inflation peaked at around 16%. It then slightly declined to 12.8% in 2013–2014. Across the period from 2006–2007 to 2014–2015, the average inflation rate for all major food products was significantly higher than during 1996–1997 to 2005–2006. Pulses experienced a threefold increase in inflation, while cereals, vegetables, milk, eggs, meat, and fish saw their rates approximately double.

==== Specific product trends ====
In terms of specific product trends, milk contributed the highest rate of inflation of 16% followed by eggs, meat, and fish (15%), cereals (13.3%), and both fruits and vegetables of 10% each. Within the food group, pulses had the highest inflation rates, while edible oils saw the lowest.

Annual Inflation rate of major food items:

- Milk: About 20% in 2009–2010 and 2010–2011; approximately 10% in 2011–2012 and 2014–2015.
- Fruits and Vegetables: 11.5% in 2007–2008, 16.4% in 2010–2011, and 23.1% in 2013–2014.
- Pulses: 31.6% in 2006–2007, 22.4% in 2009–2010, and 19.6% in 2012–2013.
- Eggs, Meat, and Fish: Consistently experienced double-digit inflation rates from 2009–2010 through 2013–2014.

== Factors causing inflation ==
=== Fuel inflation ===
Nearly 80% of total requirement of petroleum is imported by India, thus the domestic economy is very sensitive to global crude oil price fluctuations. The agricultural sector, in particular, is directly influenced by sustained high oil prices and a weakening rupee, due to the critical role energy plays in the cultivation process. Energy costs influence several components of agriculture such as the cost of fertilizers, irrigation, and powering farm tools. In Addition, transportation costs for moving agricultural produce also depend heavily on fuel prices. Thus, increased cost of cultivation causes by fuel inflation causes food inflation.

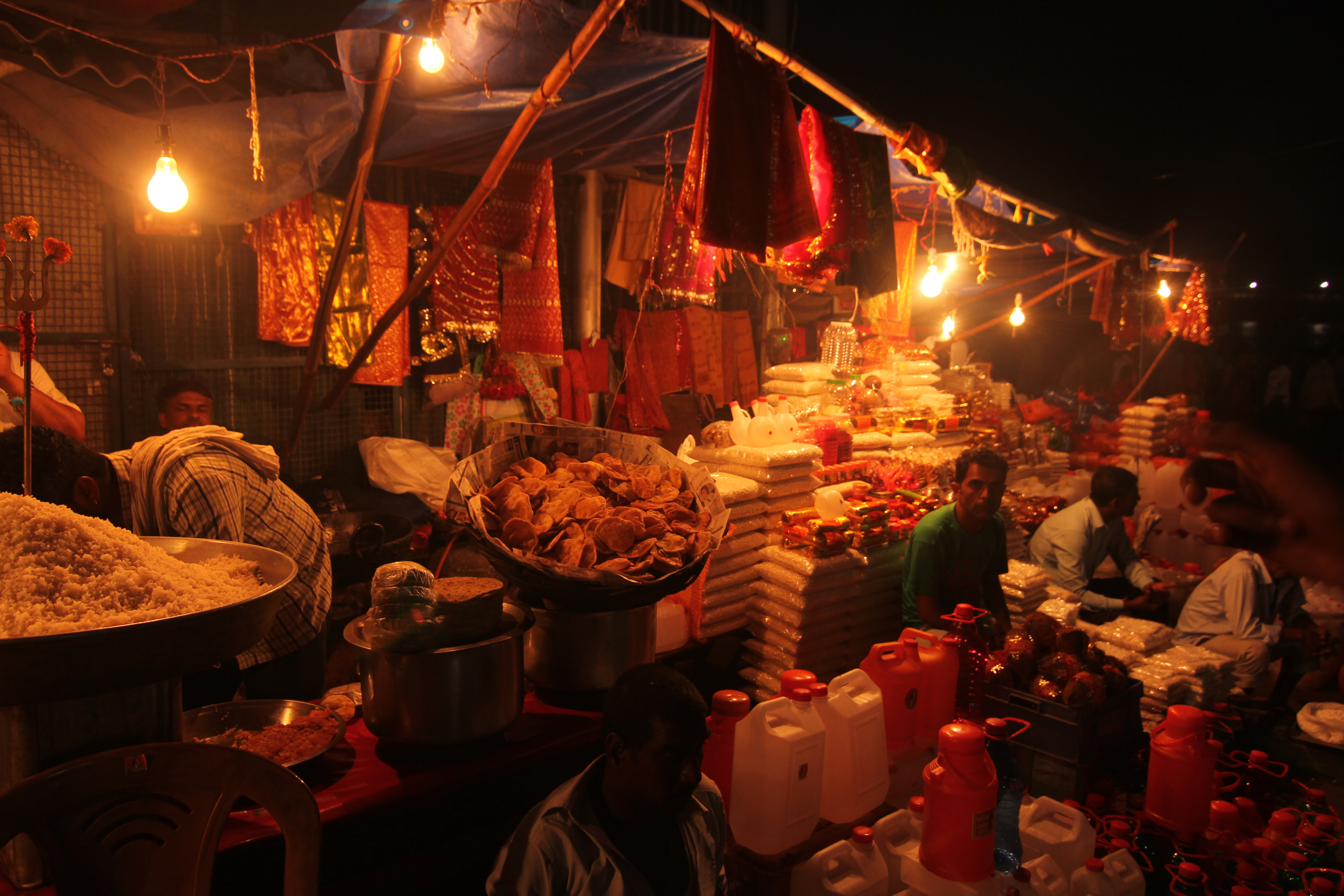
Domestic producers selling food items in wholesale markets

The deregulation of petrol and diesel prices in recent years has led to their rates being determined by market forces, adding further volatility. Since 2005, there has been a moderate positive correlation between food and fuel inflation, except during the period from November 2010 to July 2013, when this relationship weakened.

=== International prices ===
India's agricultural sector expanded in the global market with the contribution of agricultural trade towards the agricultural GDP increasing from 5.2% in 1990–1991 to 19% in 2013–2014.

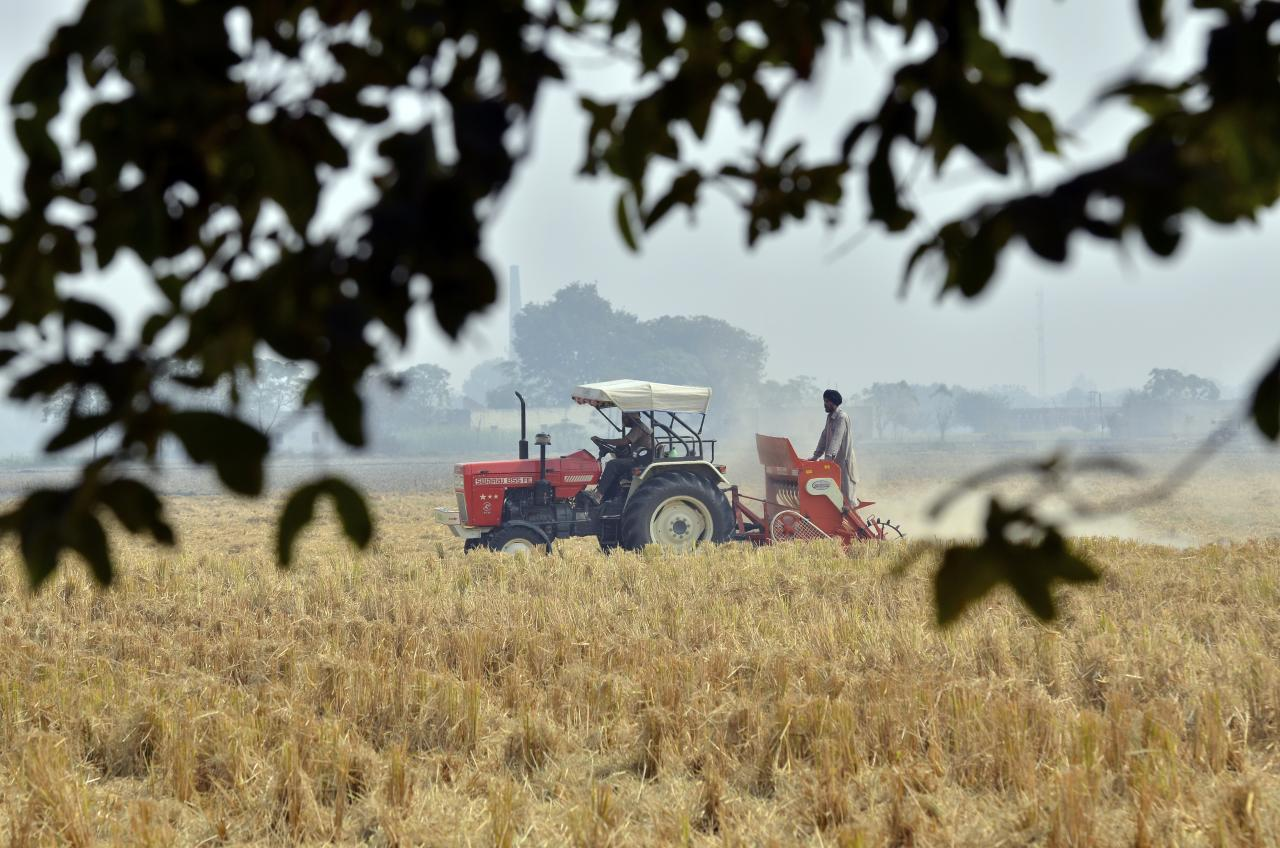
Agriculture in India-domestic production of food

Food production in 2006-2007 and 2007-2008 observed a 5% growth during these periods. The growth rate was double the growth rate of domestic demand for food. However, the majority of the excess food output never entered the domestic supply, since, due to rising global prices, exports brought more profit in the domestic market. The share of exports in domestic production of food increased from 6.2% during 2003–04 to 2005–06 to more than 10% during 2006–07 to 2008–09. This resulted in some of the increase in global prices to the domestic market, and domestic prices experienced an increase despite a significant increase in domestic food production. Therefore, the main cause of food inflation in 2008 was due to increase in International prices.

=== Agricultural wages ===
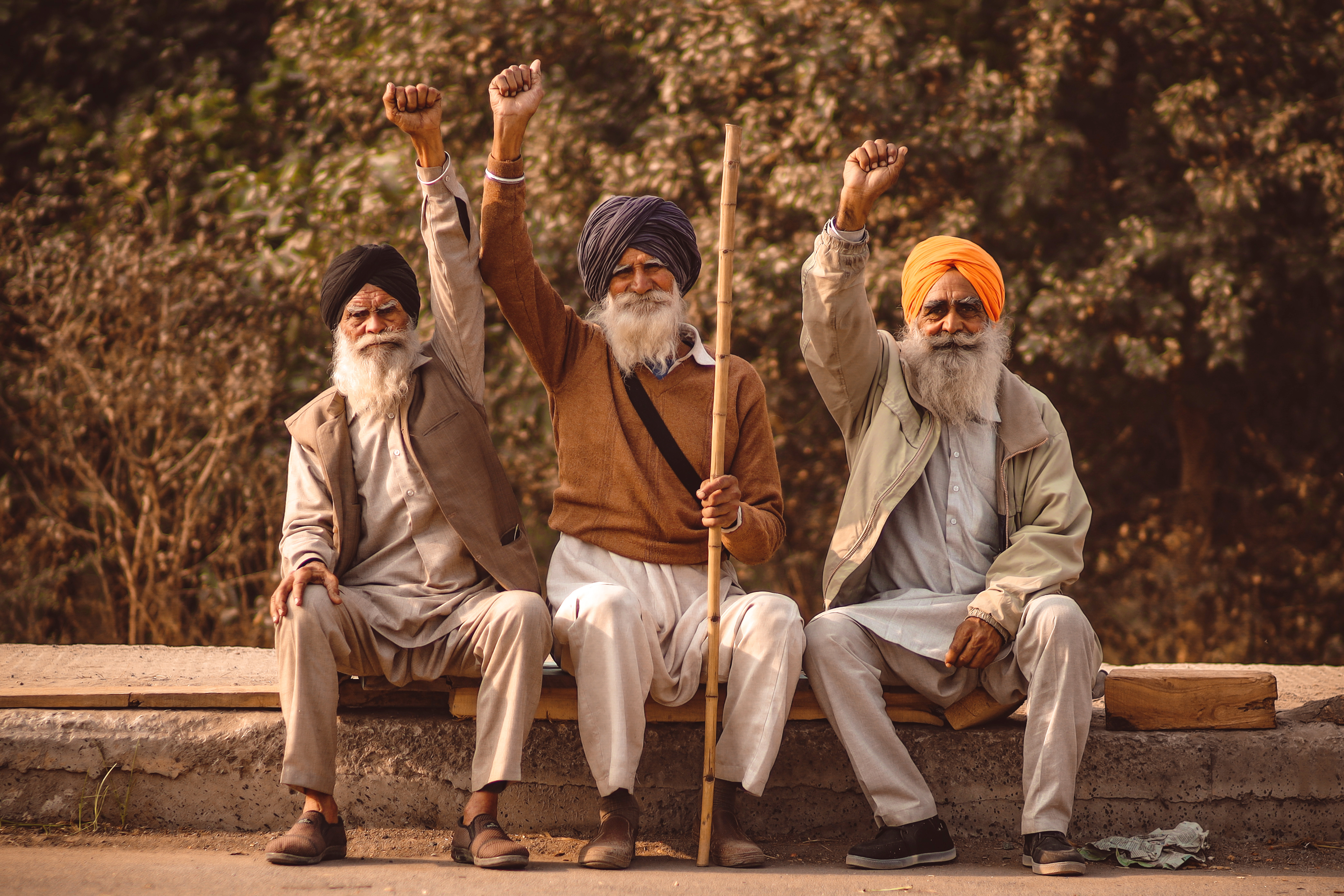
Indian Agricultural Farmers

Rural wages in India, which generally moved in line with overall inflation in 2007, began increasing post-2007. Within the rural sector, agricultural wages observed a sharper increase compared to non-agricultural wages, particularly up to mid-2011. According to the Economic Survey in 2012–2013, rural wages increased by an average of 7.5 percent. The increase in agricultural labour wages has been partly attributed to the tightening of the rural labour market following the implementation of the Mahatma Gandhi National Rural Employment Guarantee Act (MGNREGA). While rising wages contributed to higher agricultural production costs, they also played a role in reducing poverty and influencing changes in consumption patterns. Higher incomes have led to increased demand for protein-rich foods such as eggs, meat, fish, vegetables, and fruits. However, a relatively weak supply response to this demand has contributed to sustained food inflation in recent years.

=== Minimum support prices ===
Minimum Support Prices (MSPs) are government-set prices given to agricultural commodities that are procured from farmers to ensure them a minimum income, regardless of market fluctuations. While MSPs are intended to protect farmers and encourage agricultural production, several studies have found that rising MSPs have significantly contributed to food inflation in India.

Research has found that MSPs are set above market-clearing prices to be effective for procurement. However, this leads to inflationary pressures by pushing up food prices. Higher MSPs, especially for cereals like rice and wheat, directly increase market prices by establishing a price floor. They can also fluctuate agricultural incentives by encouraging more production of MSP-backed crops, such as cereals, at the cost of other crops like pulses and oilseeds, which are often in short supply. This imbalance between supply and demand contributes further to inflation.

==== Domestic import policies ====
India lacks a robust private sector mechanism for the timely import of primary food products. There are no dedicated private import houses specializing in such imports, and strict regulatory controls, combined with delays in policy announcements, often hinder private entities from responding quickly to emerging shortages in domestic markets.

==== Case study example ====
During first quarter of 2009, the global prices of sugar was around $290 per tonne. When global markets realized that India would face a sugar shortage, sugar prices rose to $470 per tonne by the third quarter of 2009. By the end of the year, prices had nearly doubled. The situation became worse due to weak coordination between the central and state governments, which delayed efforts to import sugar quickly and ease the shortage.

=== Increase in demand ===
Between the periods of 1993-1994 and 2011–2012, studies revealed that the Household Consumer Expenditure data showed that the Indian households spent less share of their total consumer expenses on food but there were significant shifts in consumer patterns. Spending on cereals and staple foods decreased while spending on primary products such as milk, eggs, meat, fish, fruits and vegetables increased. This shows a growing preference towards protein and vitamin-rich food items caused due to an increase in income and changing dietary and lifestyle preferences caused due to urbanisation.

Cross-sectional data across the period of 2011-2012 supported this trend that revealed that wealthier households spent significantly more on these nutritious foods compared to poorer households. There were significant disparities in monthly per capita expenditure across income levels. For instance, the richest rural households spent over seven times more on milk than the poorest ones, and over nine times more on fruits. This trend suggests that as people earn more, they tend to eat more diverse and nutritious diets, leading to increased demand for high-value food products.

=== Food management ===
==== Lack of infrastructure facilities ====
A bulk amount of agricultural produce in India is wasted due to improper storage facilities and infrastructure. The country's food storage capacity remains limited, and much of the existing infrastructure is not suitable for storing food beyond a few months—particularly in the case of semi-perishable and perishable items such as fruits and vegetables. Estimates suggest that approximately 30% of agricultural production is lost due to the lack of proper storage. The Food Corporation of India (FCI), responsible for managing food grain stocks, has faced criticism for inefficiencies in handling and storing grains. Similarly, the lack of cold storage and reliable transportation systems has contributed to the spoilage of large quantities of fruits and vegetables.

==== Supply shortfalls ====
India's agricultural sector faced several supply-side challenges that has contributed to supply shortages and food inflation. Since 1990, the sector recorded an average annual growth of merely 3% with high yearly volatility. Crop yields, particularly for cereals, remain lower than those in several comparable countries, including Bangladesh, China, Pakistan, and Sri Lanka. The stagnation in the area under cultivation and the plateauing of crop yields have limited the growth in production of staple and essential commodities, making it difficult to meet rising domestic demand. Additionally, while high-value agricultural products such as milk, eggs, and meat are in increasing demand, their production growth has not kept pace, highlighting supply constraints even in rapidly growing segments of the sector.

==== Weather shocks ====
In 2009, due to deficient south-west monsoon, with rainfall recorded 25% below the long-term average of Kharif season, India faced drought that destroyed domestic production of important food commodities such as pulses, rice, oilseeds and sugarcane. For example, compared to 2008, rice production declined by 12%.

In 2010, unexpected weather anomalies such as unseasonal rainfall in Maharashtra and Gujarat significantly affected onion production, leading to decreased market supply. Similarly, weather disturbances in Karnataka and Tamil Nadu resulted in 30-35% losses in onion production, leading to a sharp increase in onion prices nationwide and continuing the trend of food inflation throughout the country.

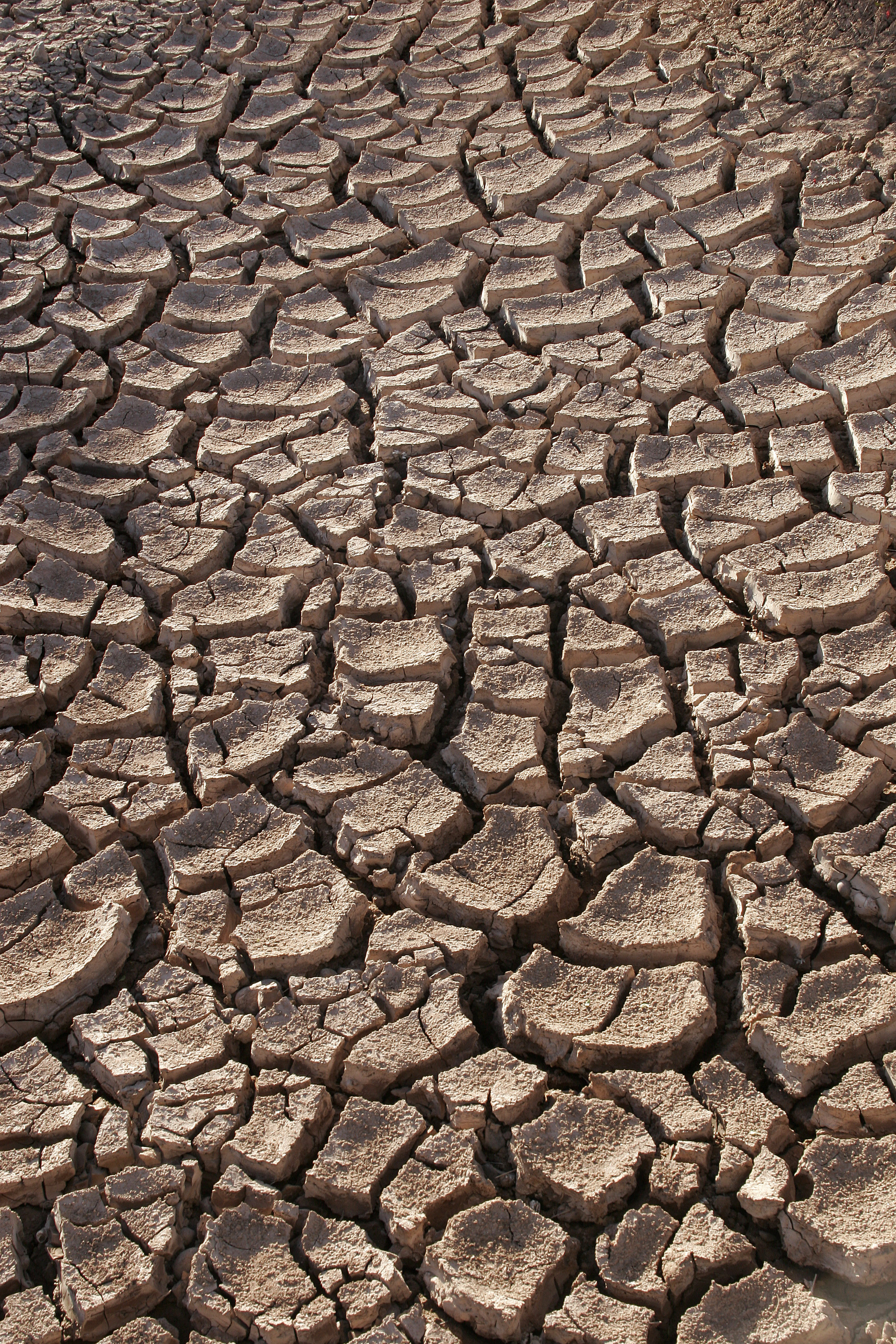
Droughts- a major threat to Food Production and a driver for Food Inflation

=== Policy recommendations ===
==== Augmenting food supply ====
For improving short-term supply of food commodities, India can rely on available buffer stocks and facilitate imports by reducing or eliminating import duties, particularly for perishable items such as fruits and vegetables.

For long-term supply improvements and price stability, Significant investment in expanding food storage infrastructure across both public and private sectors can be proposed for implementation to manage seasonal fluctuations and reduce agricultural losses.

==== Trade policy improvements ====
Due to inconsistent production patterns, commodities that are exported in surplus years often need to be imported later, resulting in cost and price volatility. Given India's status as a net food exporter, a share of exportable surplus should instead be allocated to domestic markets to ensure food security and price stability.

=== Regulatory reforms ===
==== Collaboration between public and private sectors ====
Studies have pointed out that reforming regulation in food markets by involving the private sector in the food market can improve food trade, stockholding, and price stabilization efforts. A collaborative framework between private enterprises and public agencies can improve the economic situation of domestic markets.

=== Data integration ===
A key challenge in managing food inflation in India is the lack of accurate and timely information on market conditions. This issue is due to the inconsistency and fragmentation among national-level databases, which hampers the accurate estimation of agricultural production. Such discrepancies were seen for onions, cotton, and sugar, where conflicting data led to delays in policy response and market correction.

Such discrepancies were seen for onions, cotton, and sugar, where conflicting data led to delays in policy response and market correction. To address this, there is a need to ensure better coordination and integration of existing databases. A unified data system would enable more realistic assessments of supply and availability, and help policymakers respond effectively to price fluctuations.

=== Regulatory market intelligence ===
The establishment of a dedicated commercial intelligence agency to monitor production, stock levels, trade flows, and price trends is a popular policy recommendation. This can prevent risks associated with hoarding and speculative practices by private agencies.

==== Price triggers ====
Defining specific price triggers that would automatically activate policy responses when market prices breach a pre-defined threshold is also an effective policy recommendation for managing food inflation. The role of the future market in price discovery also requires reevaluation. While futures markets are often expected to provide useful price signals, concerns about their potential to contribute to inflation also exist; such claims must be tested through empirical research.

=== Maintaining buffer/strategic stocks ===
Along with operational food grain stocks for public distribution. The central government is required to hold strategic stocks of food grains to ensure food security when production falls short and to increase grain supply in the open market to stabilise prices. These strategic stocks are held by Food Corporation of India (FCI).

As per buffer stock norms applicable from 2005 to 2014, a minimum of 5 million metric tonnes (MMT) of food grains is to be maintained at all times as strategic reserves. This includes:

- 3 MMT of wheat
- 2 MMT of rice

These stocks are separate from the operational reserves used to meet regular demand under the Targeted Public Distribution System (TPDS). These strategic stocks help against supply fluctuations and support price stability when the markets are volatile.

== Government food security reforms ==
=== Public distribution system reforms ===
India's Public Distribution System, which delivers subsidized food grains, requires urgent reforms. One such reform includes that the government ensures 100% implementation of the action plan for full computerization of the supply chain across all 36 states and Union Territories.

=== Re-evaluating National Food Security Act (NFSA) coverage ===
The National Food Security Act (NFSA) currently covers 67% of the Indian population. However, with 22–30% of the population officially below the poverty line, this broad coverage may dilute the benefits for the truly poor.

High-Level Committee (HLC) recommendations:

- Reducing NFSA coverage to 40% of the population
- Increasing the monthly grain entitlement for priority households from 5 to 7 kg per person

The prior broad coverage largely included non-poor and near-poor households, which diluted the resources for the vulnerable households and reduced per-person entitlements due to budget constraints. By narrowing the coverage to 40%, the government can save funds and redirect resources to improve the quality of food, delivery mechanisms, transport infrastructure and other supply chain and logistics investments. By increasing the per-person entitlements, fewer people have greater monthly grain allotments, increasing nutritional security and economic impact on those most in need.
