= Labour supply =

Measurement in economics

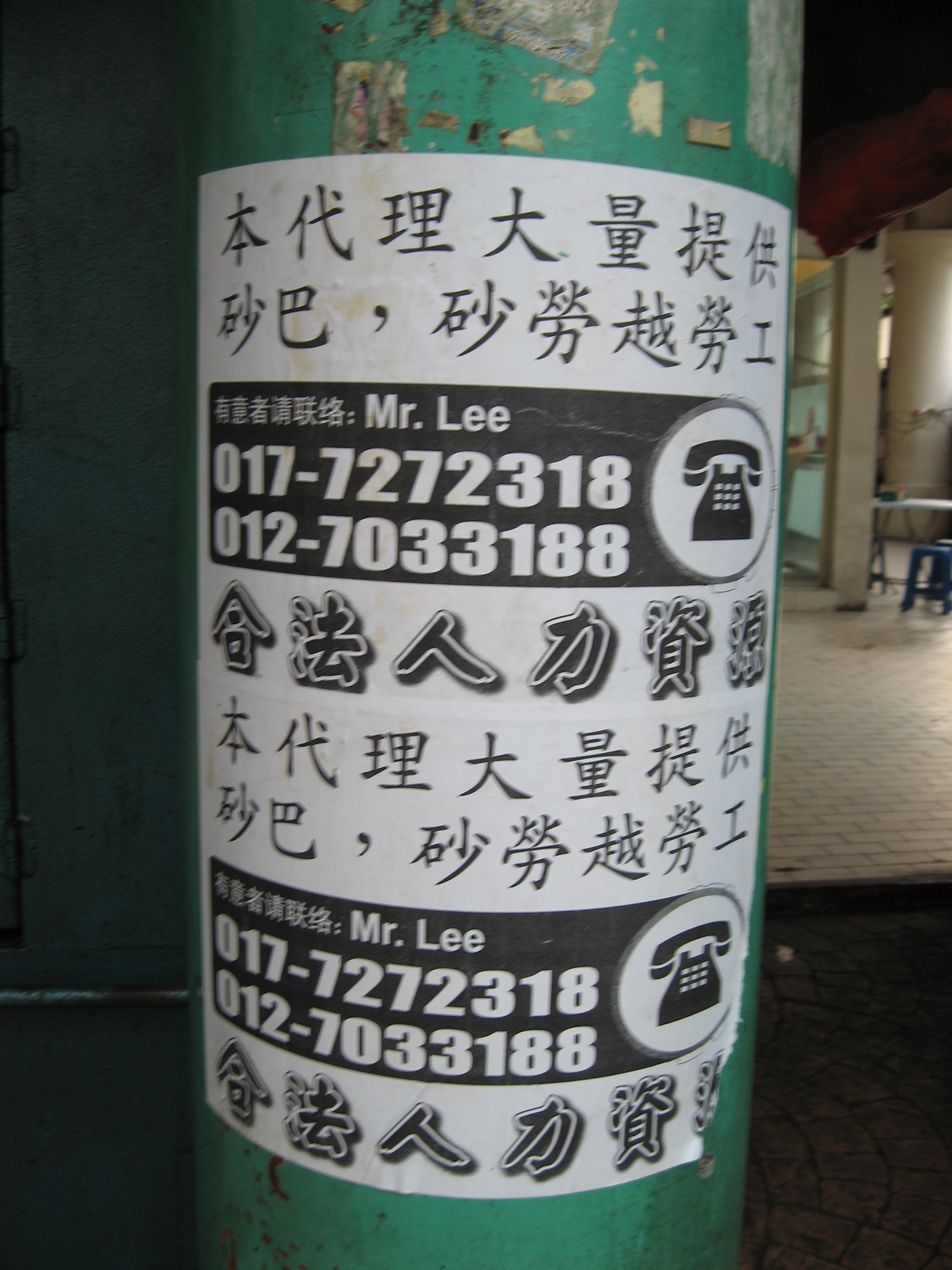
An advertisement for labour from Sabah and Sarawak, seen in Jalan Petaling, Kuala Lumpur

In mainstream economic theories, the labour supply is the total hours (adjusted for intensity of effort) that workers wish to work at a given real wage rate. It is frequently represented graphically by a labour supply curve, which shows hypothetical wage rates plotted vertically and the amount of labour that an individual or group of individuals is willing to supply at that wage rate plotted horizontally. There are three distinct aspects to labor supply or expected hours of work: the fraction of the population who are employed, the average number of hours worked by those that are employed, and the average number of hours worked in the population as a whole.

== Neoclassical view ==
This backward bending supply curve of labour shows how the change in real wage rates affects the number of hours worked by employees.

Labour supply curves derive from the 'labour-leisure' trade-off. More hours worked earn higher incomes, but necessitate a cut in the amount of leisure that workers enjoy. Consequently, there are two effects on the amount of labour supplied due to a change in the real wage rate. As, for example, the real wage rate rises, the opportunity cost of leisure increases. This tends to make workers supply more labour (the "substitution effect"). However, also as the real wage rate rises, workers earn a higher income for a given number of hours. If leisure is a normal good—the demand for it increases as income increases—this increase in income tends to make workers supply less labour so they can "spend" the higher income on leisure (the "income effect"). If the substitution effect is stronger than the income effect then the labour supply slopes upward. If, beyond a certain wage rate, the income effect is stronger than the substitution effect, then the labour supply curve bends backward. Individual labor supply curves can be aggregated to derive the total labour supply of an economy.

== Marxist view ==
From a Marxist perspective, a labour supply is a core requirement in a capitalist society. To avoid labour shortage and ensure a labour supply, a large portion of the population must not possess sources of self-provisioning, which would let them be independent—and they must instead, to survive, be compelled to sell their labour for a subsistence wage. In the pre-industrial economies wage labour was generally undertaken only by those with little or no land of their own.

== Effects of contraceptive pills on women's labor supply ==
It is utterly important to know the effects of contraceptive pills on women's labor supply to study further about the Female Labor Supply. Two innovations in the theory of household behavior have broadened the analysis of labor supply in recent years. One is the conceptualization of the labor supply as being linked to decisions about a variety of nonmarket activities such as pregnancy, education, and marriage. The second is to observe wage rates both in the market and in the home as choice variables that are influenced by the behaviors of household members in terms of job search, employment, and investment.

The first birth control pill, Enovid was released in 1960. Enovid changed the perspective of women in the workforce. Thanks to the contraceptive pill, women now had more control over family planning, which in turn led to more control and flexibility in terms of choosing occupational and career paths/goals. There is also evidence to support that at all levels of received education, this form of contraception has had long-term and far-reaching implications on Women's labor force participation rates. Historically, empirical research has lacked in the field of oral contraceptives and its impacts on Women and labor force participation. The pill's introduction in 1960 and subsequent widespread use coincided with the revival of the Women's movement at the time. Furthermore, abortion became more widely available around the same time that many young women obtained access to the pill. Evidence suggests that these breakthroughs in Women's sexual health had significant impacts on their fertility and employment/career endeavors. According to Katz and Goldin, the wider access to contraceptive pills brought about two major economic changes. First, it brought drastic changes in women's educational and career-oriented choices. In earlier years, if a woman wanted to follow her dreams of obtaining a higher education she had to delay her marriage and it came with certain social costs. She would either have to pay a penalty for sexual absenteeism or take a chance that she won't be pregnant and that her investment in he career would not go wasted. This was called the direct effect of the pill. The second was the indirect effect according to Katz and Goldin. They coined this effect as the social multiplier effect. This had an impact on both men and women. Because men also had now an opportunity to delay the marriage and not pay the huge penalty for it. Now, since everyone got the chance to delay their marriage, it created a great pool of people or better chances of marrying someone with a better match.

== Scientific journals dealing with labour supply ==
- Journal of Labor Economics
- Review of Economics of the Household
- Journal of Human Resources
- Journal of Public Economics

== See also ==
- Employment-to-population ratio
- Price elasticity of supply
  - Frisch elasticity of labor supply
