= Backward bending supply curve of labour =

Economic graphical device

The labour supply curve shows how changes in real wage rates might affect the number of hours worked by employees.

In economics, a backward-bending supply curve of labour, or backward-bending labour supply curve, is a graphical device showing a situation in which as real (inflation-corrected) wages increase beyond a certain level, people will substitute time previously devoted for paid work for leisure (non-paid time) and so higher wages lead to a decrease in the labour supply and so less labour-time being offered for sale.

The "labour-leisure" tradeoff is the tradeoff faced by wage-earning human beings between the amount of time spent engaged in wage-paying work (assumed to be unpleasant) and satisfaction-generating unpaid time, which allows participation in "leisure" activities and the use of time to do necessary self-maintenance, such as sleep. The key to the tradeoff is a comparison between the wage received from each hour of working and the amount of satisfaction generated by the use of unpaid time. Labour supply is the total number of hours that workers to work at a given wage rate.

Such a comparison generally means that a higher wage entices people to spend more time working for pay; the substitution effect implies a positively sloped labour supply curve. However, the backward-bending labour supply curve occurs when an even higher wage actually entices people to work less and consume more leisure or unpaid time.

== Overview ==
As wages increase above the subsistence level (discussed below), there are two considerations affecting a worker's choice of how many hours to work per unit of time (usually day, week, or month). The first is the substitution or incentive effect. With wages rising, the tradeoff between working an additional hour for pay and taking one extra hour of unpaid time changes in favor of working. Thus, more hours of labour-time will be offered at the higher wage than the lower one. The second and countervailing effect is that the hours worked at the old wage rate now all gain more income than before, creating an income effect, which encourages more leisure to be chosen because it is more affordable. Most economists assume that unpaid time (or "leisure") is a normal good and so people want more of it as their incomes (or wealth) rise. Since a rising wage rate raises incomes, all else constant, the attraction of unpaid time rises, eventually neutralising the substitution effect and causing the backward bend.

The graph shows that if real wages were to increase from W1 to W2, the substitution effect for an individual worker outweighs the income effect; therefore, the worker would be willing to increase hours worked for pay from L1 to L2. However, if the real wage increased from W2 to W3, the number of hours offered to work for pay would fall from L2 to L3 since the strength of the income effect now exceeds that of the substitution effect; the utility to be gained from an extra hour of unpaid time is now greater than the utility to be gained from extra income that could be earned by working the extra hour.

The above examines only the effect of changing wage rates on workers already subject to those rates; only those individuals' labour supply response was considered. The additional labour supplied by workers working in other sectors (or unemployed), who are now more attracted to the jobs in the sector because it is paying higher wages, was not considered. Thus, for a given market, the wage at which the labour supply curve bends backward may be higher than the wage at which a given worker's curve bends back.

On the other hand, for the aggregate labour market, a labour market without "other sectors" for workers, the original story of the backward-bending labour-supply curve applies except that some workers suffer from involuntary unemployment.

== Assumptions ==
It is essential to understand that with the supply curve of labour, there must be assumptions set which takes the curve's inevitable backward bending form. The assumptions for the theory of labour supply are listed as follows:

- Workers choose whether they will work, and how many hours they will work. This is important to understand because workers are the focus of the labour supply theory. Labour supply depends on the notion that workers choose how many output of time they will work. If the workers choose not to work, that is essentially working leisure, in terms of time.
- There are no contractual obligations to work a certain number of hours. This is important to understand because contractual obligations will involve the labour supply curve to be set, and not on the basis of time worked.
- Workers are utility-maximising agents. In terms of the economy, workers always want to achieve the most money or output they can receive.
- Work provides a disutility, which must be compensated for by paying wages.
- Unpaid leisure time is a "normal" good.
- The labour market is competitive, and both firms and workers are price-takers.
- Wage received is a form of a reservation wage, as workers will have a certain required amount of wage that can take them away from leisure. This sets an opportunity cost-minimizing situation for the worker.

== Caveats ==
- Higher pay for overtime hours can reduce or negate the effect of a backward bending labour supply curve, by increasing wages only for hours worked beyond a certain amount. Overtime maintains the substitution effect at a high labour supply. However, the income effect from the wages increasing on all the previous hours worked is eliminated. Thus, higher hourly overtime pay can cause workers to work more hours than if the higher rate is paid on all hours.
- Workers must have a willingness to want to work. Workers have a certain required amount of wage that can take them away from leisure. This is known as the reservation wage. This sets an opportunity cost-minimizing situation for the worker, as the worker will always want to receive the most output they can. If not enough wage is offered to clear the reservation wage boundary, the worker will not work and instead consume their utility with leisure.

== Inverted S-shaped supply curve ==
At very low wage levels, near the subsistence level, the supply curve may also be curved backwards for a completely different reason. That effect creates an "inverted S" or "backward S" shape: a tail is added at the bottom of the labour-supply curve shown in the graph above with the quantity of labour-time supplied falling as wages rise. Then, because families face some minimum level of income needed to meet their subsistence requirements, lowering wages increases the amount of labour-time offered for sale. Similarly, a rise in wages can cause a decrease in the amount of labour-time offered for sale, and individuals take advantage of the higher wage to spend time on needed self- or family-maintenance activities.

== See also ==
- Motivation crowding theory
- Self-determination theory
