= Division of international labor comparisons =

International Labor Comparisons
- BLS logo
- Abbreviation: ILC
- Formation: 1961
- Type: Government
- Purpose: Comparable statistics across countries
- Parent organization: Bureau of Labor Statistics
- Affiliations: U.S. Department of Labor
- Website: http://www.bls.gov/ilc/

The International Labor Comparisons Program (ILC) of the U.S. Bureau of Labor Statistics (BLS) adjusts economic statistics (with an emphasis on labor statistics) to a common conceptual framework in order to make data comparable across countries. Its data can be used to evaluate the economic performance of one country relative to that of other countries and to assess international competitiveness.

Since 2014, the Bureau of Labor Statistics has discontinued this program, but The Conference Board continues to publish the majority of the data series.

== History ==
=== Precursors of the International Labor Comparisons Program ===
The first commissioner of the Bureau of Labor Statistics, Carroll Wright, began the BLS tradition of international comparisons. He sent members of his staff to Europe to collect information on foreign labor force trends. In 1898, BLS published a report that compared wages in the United States to those in Europe and in 1902 it published a report that described labor conditions in Mexico.

In 1915, the first issue of the Monthly Labor Review, the Bureau's research journal, contained articles on employment and various other economic indicators in foreign countries. In the late 1940s, BLS assisted in the implementation of the Marshall Plan by developing international comparisons of labor productivity and providing technical assistance to European governments for developing their own productivity statistics.

=== Founding of the current program ===
BLS formed the current international comparisons program in the 1960s as the importance of foreign trade and interest in international competition grew. The first study published by the program was an evaluation of the comparability of unemployment rates undertaken in response to a 1961 request by the Committee to Appraise Employment and Unemployment Statistics. In 1963, the program began to publish trends of labor productivity and unit labor costs for the manufacturing sector. In the mid-1970s, the program published level comparisons of Gross Domestic Product per Capita and by 1980 levels of hourly compensation (wages and benefits) in the manufacturing sector.

=== Recent developments ===
Over time, the program expanded its coverage of labor indicators and countries. In addition to the aforementioned labor indicators, the program began to publish a number of related indicators, such as average annual hours, exchange rates, and consumer price indexes. Further, the program originally covered only selected developed countries. As developing countries became more important to U.S. trade, the program expanded its coverage to include selected emerging economies in Asia, Eastern Europe, and Latin America.

In addition, the program produced a number of special international studies on topics, such as compensation and employment in China, youth labor markets, and family structures. The current program has also shown commitment to international cooperation. ILC aided the International Labour Organization (ILO) in developing the Key Indicators of Labor Market (KILM), a compilation of fundamental measures of labor market conditions. ILC also provided KILM with data on hourly compensation.

In 2009, the name of the program was changed from the Division of Foreign Labor Statistics to the International Labor Comparisons Program. Since 2014, the Bureau of Labor Statistics has discontinued this program, but The Conference Board continues to publish the majority of the data series.

== Statistical Reporting ==
ILC prepares internationally comparable labor indicators that can be used to assess economic and labor market performance of one country relative to that of other countries and to evaluate the competitive position of different countries. The comparisons primarily cover industrialized countries and increasingly also developing countries.

=== Labor force, employment, and unemployment ===
ILC produces annual data for labor force, employment, and unemployment measures in 16 countries. Monthly and quarterly seasonally adjusted unemployment rates and employment indexes are also available. Foreign country data are adjusted to the U.S. definitions used by the U.S. Current Population Survey.

=== Hourly compensation (wages and benefits) ===
ILC's hourly compensation series presents labor costs adjusted for cross country comparability for 36 countries. Hourly compensation refers to employers’ total expenditure on labor per hour worked, and includes wages and salaries, direct benefits, and contributions to social security schemes. The ILC compensation series covers all employees and production workers in manufacturing and 22 sub-manufacturing industries, such as apparel, motor vehicles, and computer and electronics.

=== Productivity and unit labor costs ===
ILC produces internationally comparable data on productivity, calculated as output per hour worked; unit labor costs, calculated as hourly compensation per unit of output; and related measures. The data cover the manufacturing sector and, for selected series, also the whole economy for 19 countries.

=== Gross Domestic Product (GDP) per capita and per hour ===
ILC's produces internationally comparable data on Gross Domestic Product per Capita, Gross Domestic Product per Hour, and related measures for 20 countries. The data are adjusted to U.S. dollars using purchasing power parities (PPPs).

=== Consumer prices ===
ILC publishes Harmonized Indexes of Consumer Prices (HICP) that are internationally comparable and also compiles CPI data from national statistical offices. Although the national CPIs presented are not comparable across countries, they are adjusted to the same base year for all countries. In addition, ILC published an article that analyzed harmonized indexes of consumer prices.

Indicator	Main Statistics	Related Statistics	Annual Coverage	Country Coverage	Sector Coverage	Frequency of Publication
Labor Force	Labor force participation rates by sex and women's share of the labor force	Labor force levels and working-age population by sex	1970–present	16	Total economy	Annual
Employment	Employment-population ratios by sex and distribution of employment by sector	Employment levels by sector and working-age population by sex	1970–present	16	Total economy	Annual, monthly (Employment indexes only)
Unemployment	Unemployment rates by sex and by age	Unemployment levels	1970–present	16	Total economy	Annual, monthly (Unemployment rates only)
Hourly Compensation	Labor costs per hour	Wages and direct benefits	1975–present	37	Manufacturing, sub-manufacturing industries	Annual
Labor Productivity	Output per hour	Output, hours, employment	1950–present	19	Manufacturing	Annual
Unit Labor Costs	Labor cost per output	Compensation	1950–present	19	Manufacturing	Annual
GDP	GDP per capita and GDP per hour	Purchasing Power Parities, exchange rates	1960–present	19	Total economy	Annual
Price Indexes	Consumer price indexes		1950–present	16	Total economy	Annual, monthly
Harmonized Price Indexes	Harmonized indexes of consumer prices		1996–present	16	Total economy	Annual, monthly

=== Research and Special Studies ===
ILC publishes articles on international subjects in the Monthly Labor Review. Topics have included employment and compensation in China, compensation in India, labor markets for youth, and hours worked. The program publishes an annual chartbook of international labor comparisons.

== See also ==
- Statistics Portal of the Organization for Economic Cooperation and Development
- World Bank Data
- International Labour Organization Statistics
- Groningen Growth and Development Centre
- The Conference Board
- Globalization
- National Accounts
