= Harmonised Index of Consumer Prices =

Variant of Consumer Price Index in the EEA

The Harmonised Index of Consumer Prices (HICP) is an indicator of inflation and price stability for the European Central Bank (ECB). It is a consumer price index which is compiled according to a methodology that has been harmonised across EU countries. The euro area HICP is a weighted average of price indices of member states who have adopted the euro. The primary goal of the ECB is to maintain price stability, defined as keeping the year on year increase HICP target on 2% over the medium term. In order to do that, the ECB can control the short-term interest rate through Eonia, the European overnight index average, which affects market expectations. The HICP is also used to assess the convergence criteria on inflation which countries must fulfill in order to adopt the euro. In the United Kingdom, the HICP is called the CPI and is used to set the inflation target of the Bank of England.

== Comparison with the United States ==
The HICP differs from the US CPI in two primary aspects. First, the HICP attempts to incorporate rural consumers into the sample while the US maintains a survey strictly based on the urban population. Currently, the HICP does not fully incorporate rural consumers since it only uses rural samples for creating weights; prices are often only collected in urban areas. The HICP also differs from the US CPI by excluding owner-occupied housing from its scope. The US CPI calculates "rental-equivalent" costs for owner-occupied housing while the HICP considers such expenditure as investment and excludes it.

The Bureau of Labor Statistics, the producer of the U.S. CPI, calculated an experimental index designed for direct comparison with the HICP. In addition, since 2006 the Division of International Labor Comparisons at the Bureau of Labor Statistics has compiled international comparisons of the HICP for different countries.

== Controversy on housing prices ==
In sharp contrast with the US inflation index, the HICP does not include the cost of owner-occupied housing. This has been the subject of criticism from numerous academics, fellow central bankers and members of the European Parliament. In June 2018, the President of the European Central Bank Mario Draghi said in a letter to MEP Sander Loones that "the ECB has been, from a conceptual point of view, in favour of the inclusion of an owner-occupied housing price index in the HICP" but that such change required an assessment from the European statistics agency Eurostat.

However the European Commission published a report in November 2018 with an assessment of whether or not to take into account the cost of owner-occupied housing (OOH) in the HICP. The report concludes against immediate inclusion in 2018, because a monthly OOH price index is not yet available in all EU countries, and because it would deviate from the current definition of the HICP. The Commission's report also indicates that contrary to what Draghi told MEPs, the ECB had opposed the proposal when consulted by Eurostat.

Early 2019, the ECB's chief economist Peter Praet nonetheless announced that work was being underway to include real estate prices into HICP: "In line with the division of responsibilities at the European level, this work is being led by the ECB in the field of financial variables and by Eurostat for the physical market variables. The two institutions are cooperating closely on the topic and we are confident that they will make good progress."

Early 2020, ECB president Christine Lagarde hinted the cost of housing may finally be included in the HICP by the end of the ECB's strategic review.

== See also ==
- Consumer price index
- Monetary Union Index of Consumer Prices
- HICP database Eurostat
