= Wholesale price index =

Price of a representative basket of wholesale goods

The wholesale price index (WPI) is the price of a representative basket of wholesale goods.

The WPI is published by the Economic Adviser in the Ministry of Commerce and Industry. The wholesale price index focuses on the price of goods traded between corporations, rather than the goods bought by consumers, which is measured by the consumer price index. The purpose of the WPI is to monitor price movements that reflect supply and demand in industry, manufacturing and construction. This helps in analyzing both macroeconomic and microeconomic conditions.

Some countries (like the Philippines) use WPI changes as a central measure of inflation. But now India has adopted new CPI to measure inflation. However, United States now report a producer price index (PPI) instead. It also influences stock and fixed price markets.

== Calculation ==
The wholesale price index (WPI) is based on the wholesale price of a few relevant commodities of over 240 commodities available. The commodities chosen for the calculation are based on their importance in the region and the point of time the WPI is employed. For example, in India about 435 items were used for calculating the WPI in base year 1993–94 while the advanced base year 2011–12 uses 697 items. Currently the base year has been revised from 2004–05 to 2011–12 by the Office of Economic Advisor(OEA), Department for promotion of industry and internal trade Ministry of Commerce and Industry to align it with the base year of other macro economic indicators like the gross domestic product (GDP)and Index of Industrial Production (IIP).

Under primary article group of the new WPI there are 117 items against earlier 98, while fuel and power category remains static at 16. In the new series, there are 564 items of manufactured products compared to 318 items earlier.

The indicator tracks the price movement of each commodity individually. Based on this individual movement, the WPI is determined through the averaging principle. The following methods are used to compute the WPI:

The Laspeyres Formula is the weighted arithmetic mean based on the fixed value-based weights for the base period.

The Ten-Day Price Index is a procedure under which, “sample prices” with high intra-month fluctuations are selected and surveyed every ten days by phone. Utilizing the data retrieved by this procedure, and with the assumption that other non-surveyed “sample prices” remain unchanged, a “ten-day price index” is compiled and released.

Monthly price indexes are compiled by calculating the simple arithmetic mean of three ten-day “sample prices” in the month.

== See also ==
- Monetary Union Index of Consumer Prices
- Price index
