= Monetary Union Index of Consumer Prices =

The Monetary Union Index of Consumer Prices (MUICP) is a weighted average of European Monetary Union countries' HICP (Harmonised Index of Consumer Prices). It is widely used a measure of inflation throughout the Eurozone - the countries with the euro as their currency.

== See also ==
- Harmonised Index of Consumer Prices
- Consumer price index
- Inflation
