= Workforce productivity =

Concept in economics

GDP per hour worked (percentage; USA=100)

Workforce productivity is the amount of goods and services that a group of workers produce in a given amount of time. It is one of several types of productivity that economists measure. Workforce productivity, often referred to as labor productivity, is a measure for an organisation or company, a process, an industry, or a country.

Workforce productivity is to be distinguished from employee productivity, which is a measure employed at the individual level based on the assumption that the overall productivity can be broken down into increasingly smaller units until, ultimately, to the individual employee—in order to be used, for example, for the purpose of allocating a benefit or sanction based on individual performance (see also: Vitality curve).

The OECD defines productivity as "a ratio between the volume of output and the volume of inputs". Volume measures of output are normally gross domestic product (GDP) or gross value added (GVA), expressed at constant prices i.e. adjusted for inflation. The three most commonly used measures of input are:

1. hours worked, typically from the OECD Annual National Accounts database
2. workforce jobs; and
3. number of people in employment.

== Measurement ==
The U.S. Bureau of Labor Statistics distinguishes labor productivity from total factor productivity. Labor productivity compares growth in output with growth in hours worked, while total factor productivity compares output growth with growth in a combination of labor, capital, energy, materials, and purchased services. For its business-sector measures, BLS uses value-added output; for manufacturing and industry measures, it uses sectoral output.

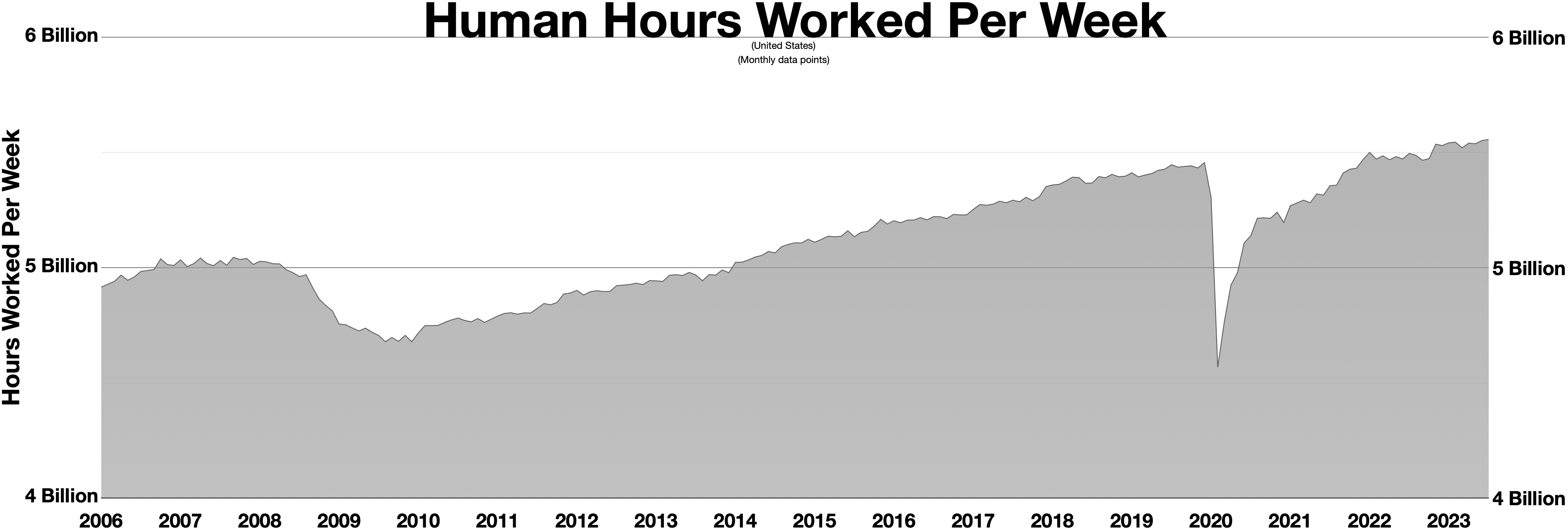
Human-hours worked per week

Workforce productivity can be measured in two ways, in physical terms or in price terms.

- the intensity of labour-effort, and the quality of labour effort generally.
- the creative activity involved in producing technical innovations.
- the relative efficiency gains resulting from different systems of management, organization, co-ordination or engineering.
- the productive effects of some forms of labour on other forms of labour.

These aspects of productivity refer to the qualitative dimensions of labour input. If an organization is using labour much more intensely, it can be assumed that it is due to greater labour productivity, since the output per labour-effort may be the same. This insight becomes particularly important when a large part of what is produced in an economy consists of services. Management may be very preoccupied with the productivity of employees, but the productivity gains of management itself are very difficult to prove. While labor productivity growth has been seen as a useful barometer of the U.S. economy's performance, recent research has examined why U.S. labor productivity rose during the recent downturn of 2008–2009, when U.S. gross domestic product plummeted.

The validity of international comparisons of labour productivity can be limited by a number of measurement issues. The comparability of output measures can be negatively affected by the use of different valuations, which define the inclusion of taxes, margins, and costs, or different deflation indexes, which turn the current output into constant output. Labor input can be biased by different methods used to estimate average hours or different methodologies used to estimate employed persons. In addition, for level comparisons of labor productivity, the output needs to be converted into a common currency. The preferred conversion factors are purchasing power parities, but their accuracy can be negatively influenced by the limited representativeness of the goods and services compared and different aggregation methods. To facilitate international comparisons of labor productivity, a number of organizations, such as the OECD, the Groningen Growth Centre, the International Labor Comparisons Program, and The Conference Board, prepare productivity data adjusted specifically to enhance the data's international comparability.

== Factors of labour productivity and quality ==
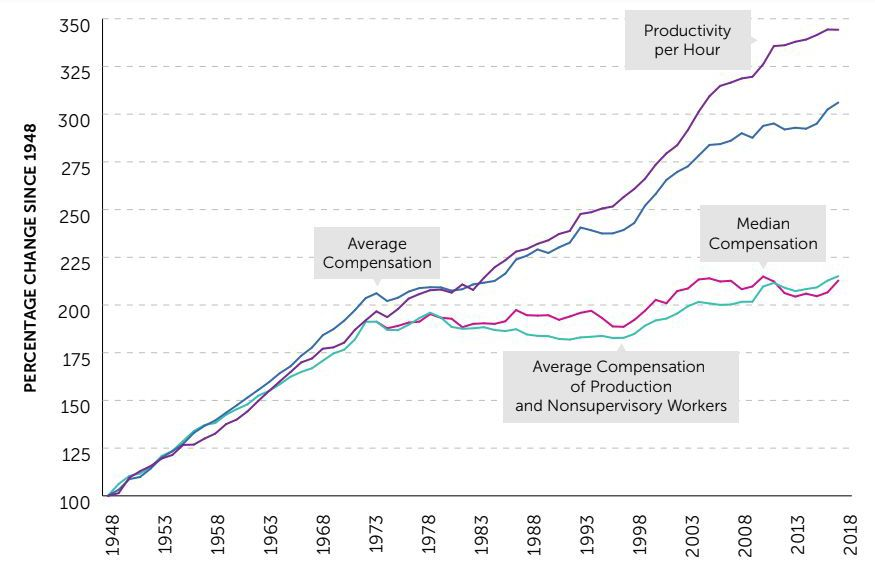
Productivity and Compensation Growth in the United States, 1948–2016

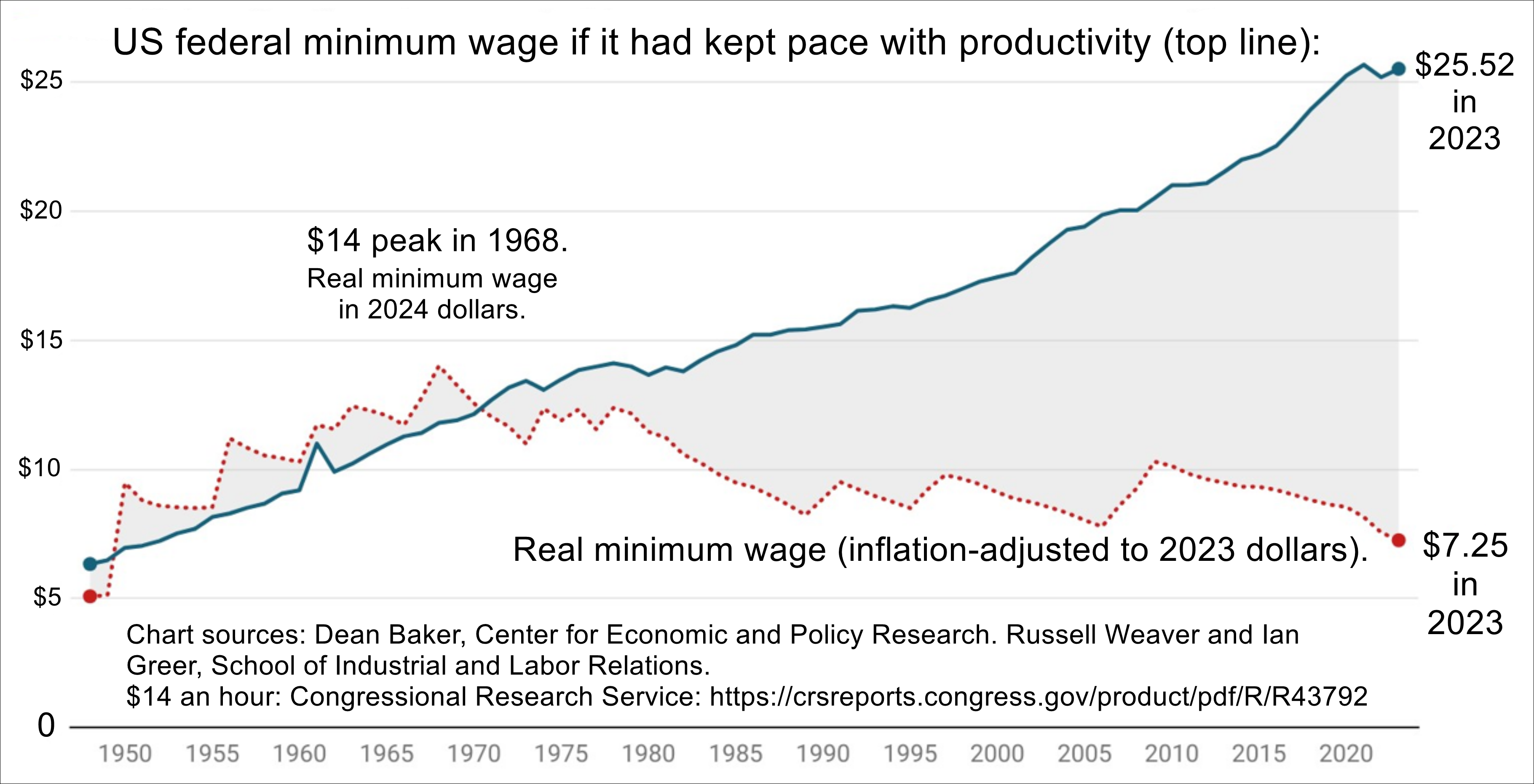
US federal minimum wage if it had kept pace with the average worker's productivity. Also, the inflation-adjusted minimum wage.

In a survey of manufacturing growth and performance in Britain and Mauritius, it was found that:

"The factors affecting labour productivity or the performance of individual work roles are of broadly the same type as those that affect the performance of manufacturing firms as a whole. They include: (1) physical-organic, location, and technological factors; (2) cultural belief-value and individual attitudinal, motivational and behavioural factors; (3) international influences – e.g. levels of innovativeness and efficiency on the part of the owners and managers of inward investing foreign companies; (4) managerial-organizational and wider economic and political-legal environments; (5) levels of flexibility in internal labour markets and the organization of work activities – e.g. the presence or absence of traditional craft demarcation lines and barriers to occupational entry; and (6) individual rewards and payment systems, and the effectiveness of personnel managers and others in recruiting, training, communicating with, and performance-motivating employees on the basis of pay and other incentives."

It was further found that:

"The emergence of computers has been noted as a significant factor in increasing labor productivity in the late 1990s, by some, and as an insignificant factor by others, such as R. J. Gordon. Although computers have existed for most of the 20th century, some economic researchers have noted a lag in productivity growth caused by computers that didn't come until the late 1990s."

== Maximizing workforce productivity: strategies and perspectives ==
Workforce productivity, a cornerstone of economic and organizational success, represents the efficiency and effectiveness with which individuals and teams accomplish tasks and contribute to their respective fields. It encompasses a multifaceted spectrum of factors, ranging from time management and employee engagement to the integration of cutting-edge technologies and the promotion of well-being.

It serves as a foundational concept for optimizing the efficiency and effectiveness of individuals and teams in the workplace and encompasses a broad spectrum of strategies and perspectives that many use to both understand and enhance productivity in their workplace.

1. Time management and efficiency:

Time management and efficiency refer to the systematic organization and allocation of tasks and resources to maximize productivity. It involves strategies for effectively utilizing available time to achieve desired goals. Time management entails the systematic organization and planning of how to allocate one's time to various tasks and activities. By reducing time wastage and prioritizing tasks, individuals and organizations can enhance their productivity.

2. Employee engagement and satisfaction:

Employee engagement and satisfaction are essential factors influencing workforce productivity. Employee engagement refers to the level of commitment and enthusiasm employees have toward their work, while satisfaction relates to their contentment with their job and workplace. Research has shown that engaged and satisfied employees tend to be more productive, leading to improved overall organizational performance.

In 2009, Harter and colleagues conducted a comprehensive meta-analysis, comprising 199 research studies conducted across 152 organizations spanning 44 industries and 26 countries. Their findings revealed substantial disparities between business units that ranked in the top and bottom 25% in terms of engagement. Specifically, they observed an 18% decline in productivity among the bottom performers compared to the top performers. Furthermore, there was a substantial 60% reduction in product quality, as measured by defects in the products.

3. Workplace technology and automation

Workplace technology and automation involve the integration of technological solutions and automated processes to streamline tasks and workflows. This can significantly impact workforce productivity by reducing manual labor, minimizing errors, and accelerating processes. However, striking a balance between automation and human involvement is crucial to maintain a productive and adaptable workforce.

In today's workforce, automation is seen as an invaluable ally. An extensive survey found that over 90% of employees believe automation solutions have significantly boosted their productivity, with 85% stating that these tools have enhanced collaboration within their teams. Furthermore, nearly 90% expressed a high level of trust in automation solutions, relying on them to streamline processes, reduce errors, and accelerate decision-making.

4. Training and skill development

Training and skill development programs are vital for enhancing workforce productivity. Continuous learning and skill improvement enable employees to stay relevant in rapidly changing industries. Organizations that invest in training programs can bridge skill gaps, increase employee competence, and ultimately boost productivity.

This not only reduces errors and rework but also boosts their confidence and job satisfaction. Moreover, continuous skill development keeps the workforce updated with the latest industry trends and technologies, ensuring that the organization remains competitive. In the long run, investing in employee training not only improves individual performance but also contributes significantly to the overall productivity and success of the workplace.

5. Communication and collaboration

Effective communication and collaboration are often cited as strategies for team and organizational productivity. Communication ensures that team members are aligned with objectives, and collaborative tools facilitate efficient teamwork. Overcoming communication barriers and adopting modern collaboration techniques can be used to enhancing productivity in today's interconnected workplaces.

When teams communicate clearly and openly, they can share ideas, information, and feedback more efficiently. This strategy aims to minimize misunderstandings and align the workforce's efforts towards common goals. Collaboration, on the other hand, encourages the pooling of diverse skills and perspectives, leading to innovative solutions and problem-solving.

Research suggests that workplace communication and collaboration practices may influence employee performance and organizational outcomes. Studies have found correlations between effective communication structures and indicators such as team coordination, knowledge sharing, and project completion rates.

Organizations that implement collaborative frameworks often report improvements in employee engagement and productivity metrics, though the extent of these effects can vary based on industry, team size, and organizational culture. Some scholars argue that open communication channels facilitate problem-solving and innovation, while others note that excessive collaboration can lead to diminished individual productivity.

The relationship between workplace culture and performance outcomes remains an active area of research in organizational psychology and management studies.

6. Health and well-being

Employee health and well-being are closely linked to productivity. Maintaining physical and mental health is essential for sustained high performance. Additionally, maintaining this equilibrium can also have a positive impact on personal relationships.

Achieving a satisfactory work–life balance offers a multitude of advantages to employers. It results in increased productivity, reduced absenteeism, and enhanced physical and mental well-being, as employees exhibit higher commitment and motivation towards their work. Companies that promote a healthy work–life balance, provide mental health support, and encourage overall well-being tend to have more productive and engaged employees.

7. Performance metrics and KPIs

Performance metrics and key performance Indicators (KPIs) are quantifiable measures used to assess and track productivity. Setting and monitoring these indicators help organizations evaluate their progress toward goals, identify areas for improvement, and make data-driven decisions to enhance productivity.

Performance metrics and key performance indicators (KPIs) are widely used tools in the context of workplace productivity assessment. These quantitative and qualitative measures serve as benchmarks for evaluating employee and organizational performance. They enable businesses to gauge the effectiveness of their processes and the attainment of predetermined objectives. By establishing and tracking these metrics, organizations can identify areas requiring improvement and optimize resource allocation. Moreover, KPIs help in aligning individual and team goals with the strategic objectives of the enterprise, fostering a sense of purpose and accountability among the workforce. In essence, the systematic use of performance metrics and KPIs empowers organizations to make data-driven decisions, address operational inefficiencies, and ultimately enhance workplace productivity.

8. Leadership and management

Leadership and management are foundational elements in the context of workplace productivity. Leadership, in essence, embodies the art of inspiring and guiding individuals or teams toward achieving collective objectives. Effective leaders set a clear vision, establish a compelling direction, and serve as role models, instilling a sense of purpose and motivation within the workforce. In contrast, management focuses on the efficient allocation and utilization of resources, encompassing tasks such as organizing work processes, distributing responsibilities, and monitoring progress. The interplay between these two functions is critical, as it establishes an organizational culture where employees are not only encouraged but also empowered to excel. This synergy is often used to cultivate an environment marked by high morale, reduced turnover, and ultimately, elevated productivity levels, making leadership and management integral components of a thriving workplace.

9. Flexibility, temporary staff, and remote work

Flexibility in work arrangements, including remote work, has gained prominence in recent times. Remote work best practices, technology adoption, and balancing flexibility with productivity goals are topics of significance in modern workplaces. Ensuring remote teams remain productive is a key challenge for organizations.

Flexibility in workforce arrangements, including the use of temporary staff and the adoption of remote work, can significantly impact workplace productivity when managed effectively. Embracing these practices allows organizations to adapt to changing demands and access a broader talent pool. Temporary staff can provide expertise for specific projects or cover peak workloads, while remote work offers employees greater autonomy and work–life balance. However, when not managed well, these arrangements can have adverse consequences. Without clear guidelines and communication, temporary staff may not integrate seamlessly, and remote work can lead to feelings of isolation and reduced collaboration. Therefore, successful implementation of flexibility measures requires careful planning, robust communication channels, and adequate support systems to ensure that these practices contribute positively to overall workplace productivity. These strategies enable organizations to respond to evolving operational requirements and access a wider talent pool.

10. Workplace culture and values

Workplace culture and values are foundational elements that influence productivity. A culture that values productivity and aligns with employee goals can motivate individuals to perform at their best. Promoting diversity and inclusion within the workplace can also enhance productivity by tapping into a broader range of talents and perspectives.

11. Conflict resolution and team dynamics

Conflict resolution and positive team dynamics are essential for maintaining productivity. Resolving conflicts constructively and building high-performing teams are topics of interest in human resource management. Strategies for conflict prevention can contribute to a harmonious work environment conducive to productivity.

Conflicts, though inevitable in any professional setting, can disrupt workflow and hinder progress. Effective conflict resolution strategies, however, mitigate these disruptions by addressing issues promptly and constructively, ensuring that differences in opinions or working styles do not escalate into major obstacles. Furthermore, promoting positive team dynamics, characterized by open communication, trust, and collaboration, creates an environment where team members feel valued and supported. This, in turn, encourages the exchange of ideas and sharing of responsibilities, resulting in increased efficiency and creativity. Ultimately, a workplace that prioritizes conflict resolution and nurtures harmonious team dynamics not only mitigates productivity hurdles but also cultivates an environment conducive to continuous improvement and innovation.

12. Innovation and creativity

Organizations that encourage creative thinking and provide the necessary resources for innovation can find more efficient ways of working, leading to productivity improvements.

Innovation and creativity can be pivotal drivers of workplace productivity. When employees are encouraged to think creatively and come up with innovative solutions, it opens doors to improved processes, products, and services. Creative problem-solving allows for more efficient ways of tackling challenges, while innovation leads to the development of new tools and techniques. Moreover, a culture that values innovation fosters employee engagement and satisfaction, as individuals are empowered to contribute their unique insights and ideas. This sense of ownership and involvement not only bolsters morale but also fuels a heightened sense of purpose, ultimately resulting in a more productive workforce. In essence, innovation and creativity not only drive workplace productivity but also position organizations for sustained success in a rapidly evolving business landscape.

== See also ==
- List of countries by labour productivity
- Industrial engineering
- Overall labor effectiveness
- Personal income in the United States
