= Real wages =

Buying power of income

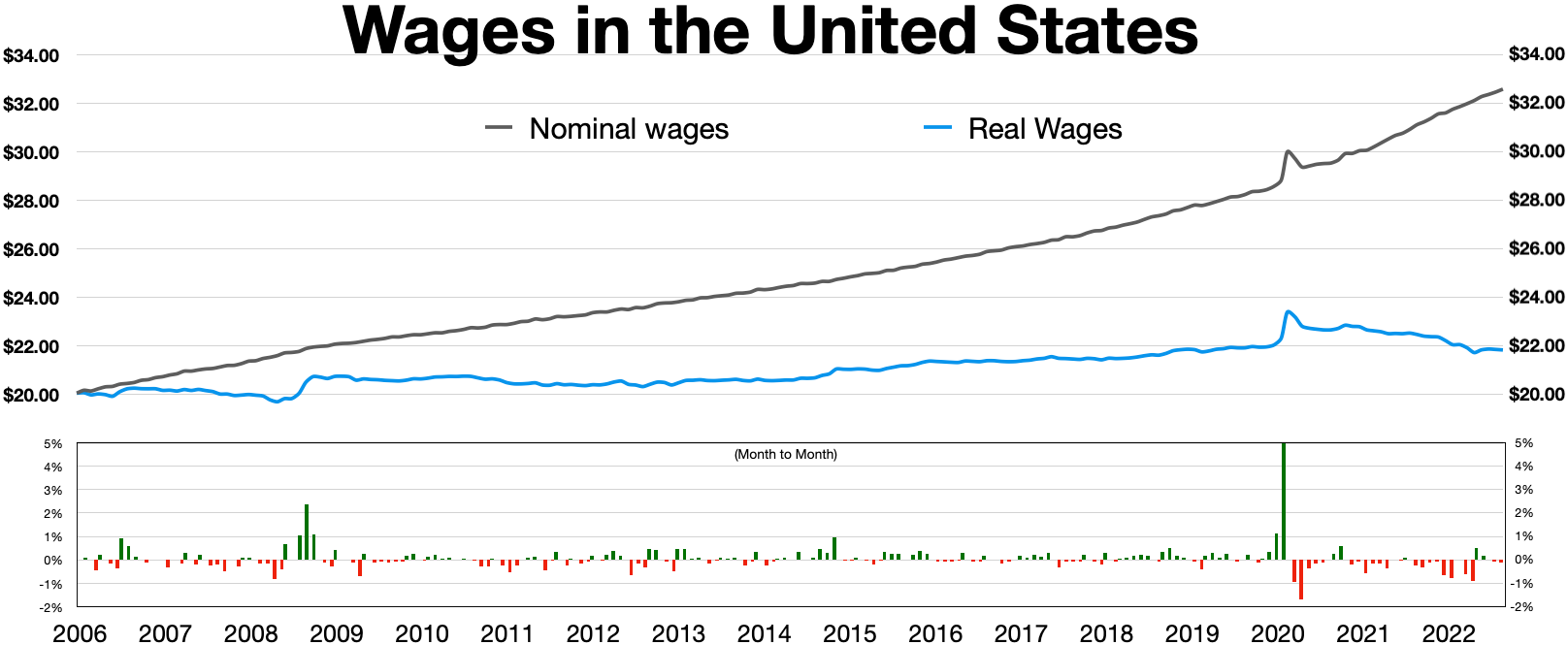
Wages month to month rate (before taxes) Nominal wages Adjusted-for-inflation wages

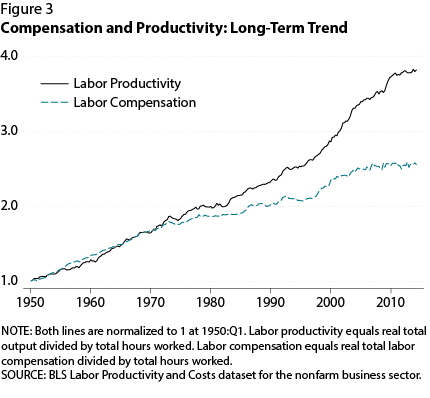
Labor productivity vs. compensation in the United States

Real wages are wages adjusted for inflation, or equivalently wages in terms of the amount of goods and services that can be bought. This term is used in contrast to nominal wages or unadjusted wages. Because it has been adjusted to account for changes in the prices of goods and services, real wages provide a clearer representation of an individual's wages in terms of what they can afford to buy with those wages – specifically, in terms of the amount of goods and services that can be bought; however, real wages suffer the disadvantage of not being well defined, since the amount of inflation (which can be calculated based on different combinations of goods and services) is itself not well defined. Hence real wage defined as the total amount of goods and services that can be bought with a wage, is also not defined. This is because of changes in the relative prices.

Despite difficulty in defining one value for the real wage, in some cases a real wage can be said to have unequivocally increased. This is true if: After the change, the worker can now afford any bundle of goods and services that they could just barely afford before the change, and still have money left over. In such a situation, real wage increases no matter how inflation is calculated. Specifically, inflation could be calculated based on any good or service or combination thereof, and real wage has still increased. This of course leaves many scenarios where real wage increasing, decreasing or staying the same depends upon how inflation is calculated. These are the scenarios where the worker can buy some of the bundles that they could just barely afford before and still have money left, but at the same time they simply cannot afford some of the bundles that they could before. This happens because some prices change more than others, which means relative prices have changed.

The use of adjusted figures is used in undertaking some forms of economic analysis. For example, to report on the relative economic successes of two nations, real wage figures are more useful than nominal figures. The importance of considering real wages also appears when looking at the history of a single country. If only nominal wages are considered, the conclusion has to be that people used to be significantly poorer than today. However, the cost of living was also much lower. To have an accurate view of a nation's wealth in any given year, inflation has to be taken into account and real wages must be used as one measuring stick. There are further limitations in the traditional measures of wages, such as failure to incorporate additional employment benefits, or not adjusting for a changing composition of the overall workforce.

An alternative is to look at how much time it took to earn enough money to buy various items in the past, which is one version of the definition of real wages as the amount of goods or services that can be bought. Such an analysis shows that for most items, it takes much less work time to earn them now than it did decades ago, at least in the United States.

== Example ==
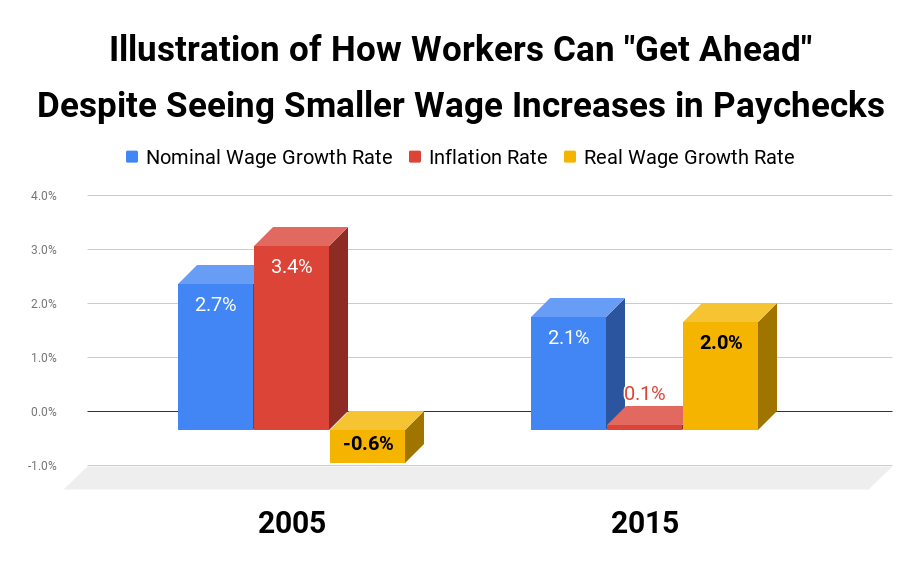
Higher wage growth in workers' paychecks, if accompanied by higher inflation, can result in lower purchasing power for workers than during a period with lower nominal wage growth combined with lower inflation. Data: https://fred.stlouisfed.org/graph/?g=mwFz

Consider an example economy with the following wages over three years. Also assume that the inflation in this economy is 2% per year:

- Year 1: $20,000
- Year 2: $20,400
- Year 3: $20,808

Real wage = W/i (W = wage, i = inflation, can also be subjugated as interest).

If the figures shown are real wages, then wages have increased by 2% after inflation has been taken into account. In effect, an individual making this wage actually has more ability to buy goods and services than the previous year. However, if the figures shown are nominal wages then real wages are not increasing at all. In absolute dollar amounts, an individual is bringing home more money each year, but the increases in inflation actually zeroes out the increases in their salary. Given that inflation is increasing at the same pace as wages, an individual cannot actually afford to increase their consumption in such a scenario.

The nominal wage increases a worker sees in his paycheck may give a misleading impression of whether he is "getting ahead" or "falling behind" over time. For example, the average worker’s paycheck increased 2.7% in 2005, while it increased 2.1% in 2015, creating an impression for some workers that they were "falling behind". However, inflation was 3.4% in 2005, while it was only 0.1% in 2015, so workers were actually "getting ahead" with lower nominal paycheck increases in 2015 compared to 2005.

== Stagnation ==
Historically, the trends of real wages are typically divided into two phases. The first phase, known as the Malthusian phase of history, consists of the period of time before the mass modern economic growth that began around 1800. During this phase, real wages grew very slowly, if at all, since increases in productivity would typically result in equivalent population growth that offset this increased production and left the income per person relatively constant in the long run. The second phase, known as the Solow phase, occurred after 1800 and corresponded with the massive technological and societal improvements brought about by the industrial revolution. In this phase, population growth has been more restrained, and as such real wages have risen much more dramatically with rapid increases in technology and productivity over time.

After the Great Recession, real wages globally have stagnated with a world average real wage growth rate of 2% in 2013. Africa, Eastern Europe, Central Asia, and Latin America have all experienced real wage growth of under 0.9% in 2013, whilst the developed countries of the OECD have experienced real wage growth of 0.2% in the same period. (Conversely, Asia has consistently experienced strong real wage growth of over 6% from 2006 to 2013.) The International Labour Organisation has stated that wage stagnation has resulted in "a declining share of GDP going to labour while an increasing share goes to capital, especially in developed economies."

=== United States ===
The Economic Policy Institute stated wages have failed to keep up with productivity in the United States since the mid 1970s, and that wages have therefore stagnated. According to them, between 1973 and 2013, productivity grew 74.4% and hourly compensation grew 9.2%, contradicting the neoclassical economic theory that those two should rise equally together. However, the Heritage Foundation says these claims rest on misinterpreted economic statistics. According to them, productivity grew 100% between 1973 and 2012 while employee compensation, which accounts for worker benefits as well as wages, grew 77%. The Economic Policy Institute and the Heritage Foundation used different inflation adjusting methods in their studies.

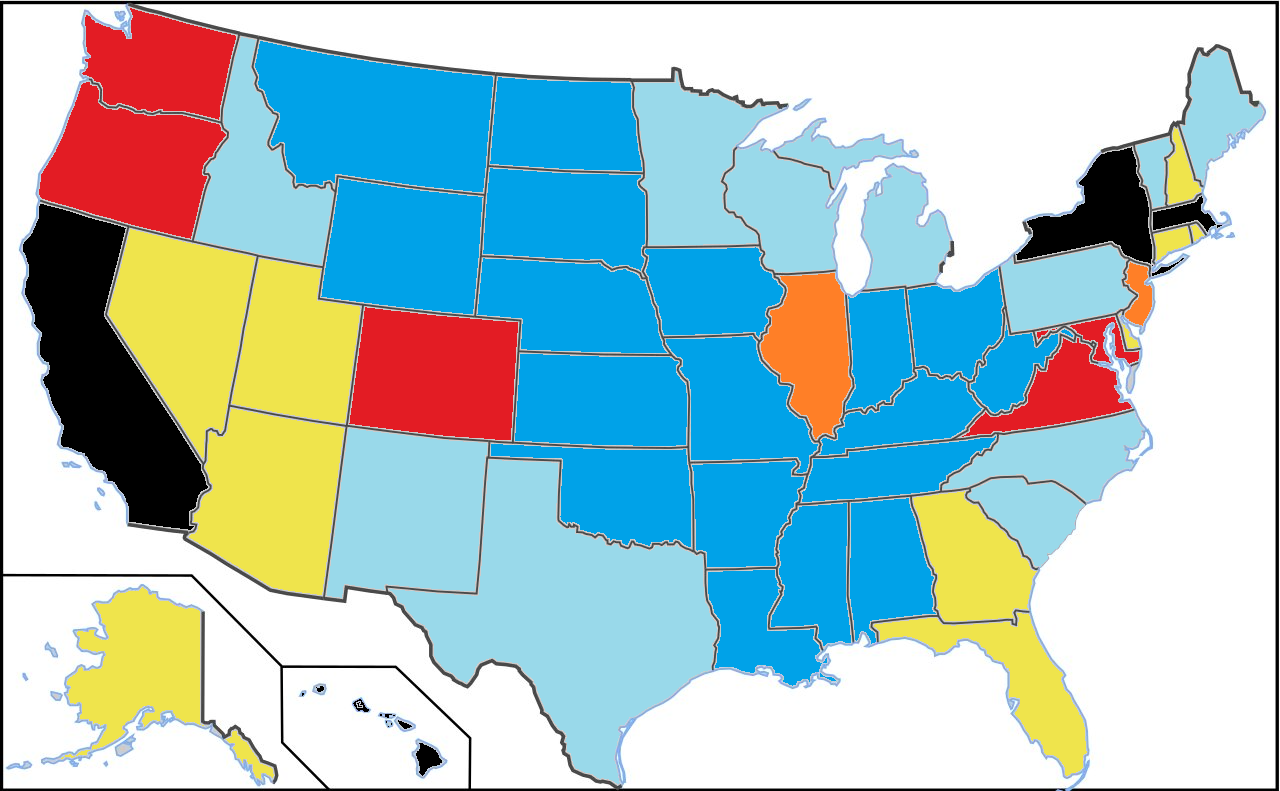
A heat map of the United States by living wage for a single, childless individual according to the MIT living wage calculator as of 2023 $15-15.99 $16.00-16.99 $17.00-17.99 $18.00-18.99 $19.00-19.99 $20+

Besides rising benefit costs, proposed causes of wage stagnation include the decline of labor unions, loss of job mobility (including through non-competes), and declining employment by the manufacturing sector.

=== Europe ===
The countries of Belgium, France, Germany, Italy and the United Kingdom have experienced strong real wage growth following European integration in the early 1980s.^{[6]} However, according to OECD between 2007 and 2015 the United Kingdom saw a real wage decline of 10.4%, equal only to Greece.

A 2014 study argued that wages now respond more strongly to changes in unemployment rates. It documented how the UK's 1979 - 2010 real wage growth across deciles has stagnated since 2003. Its models found that pre-2003, a doubling of the unemployment rate saw median wages fall 7%, but now the same doubling sees a fall of 12%.

A 2018 paper contended that a major source of wage stagnation is underemployment. (Note: Whilst an unemployed worker wants to work but has no job, an underemployed worker has a job but wants to work more. Ways to measure this include part-time workers who want to be full time, or the number extra hours workers wish to work.) It studied the OECD with a focus on the UK, finding that unemployment rates often returned to 2007's pre-Great Recession levels. However, 2017 underemployment rates in many countries were still worse than 2007. So it argues that the low unemployment rates hide continued "labour market slack": its models found underemployment was negatively related to wages both in the UK and other countries.

== See also ==
- Real versus nominal value (economics)
