= Homothetic preferences =

Characteristic in consumer theory

In consumer theory, a consumer's preferences are called homothetic if they can be represented by a utility function which is homogeneous of degree 1. For example, in an economy with two goods $x,y$, homothetic preferences can be represented by a utility function $u$ that has the following property: for every $a>0$:

$$u(a\cdot x,a\cdot y) = a\cdot  u(x,y)$$

In mathematics, a homothetic function is a monotonic transformation of a function which is homogeneous; however, since ordinal utility functions are only defined up to an increasing monotonic transformation, there is a small distinction between the two concepts in consumer theory.

In a model where competitive consumers optimize homothetic utility functions subject to a budget constraint, the ratios of goods demanded by consumers will depend only on relative prices, not on income or scale. This translates to a linear expansion path in income: the slope of indifference curves is constant along rays beginning at the origin. This is to say, the Engel curve for each good is linear.

Furthermore, the indirect utility function can be written as a linear function of wealth $w$:

$$v(p_x,p_y,w) = f(p_x,p_y)\cdot w$$

which is a special case of the Gorman polar form. Hence, if all consumers have homothetic preferences (with the same coefficient on the wealth term), aggregate demand can be calculated by considering a single "representative consumer" who has the same preferences and the same aggregate income.

== Examples ==
Utility functions having constant elasticity of substitution (CES) are homothetic. They can be represented by a utility function such as:

$$u(x,y) = \left(\left({x\over w_x}\right)^{\!r} + \left({y\over w_y}\right)^{\!r}\ \right)^{\!1/r}$$

This function is homogeneous of degree 1:

$$u(a x,a y) = \left(a^r\left({x\over w_x}\right)^{\!r} + a^r\left({y\over w_y}\right)^{\!r}\ \right)^{\!1/r} = (a^r)^{1/r} \left(\left({x\over w_x}\right)^{\!r} + \left({y\over w_y}\right)^{\!r}\ \right)^{\!1/r} = a u(x,y)$$

Linear utilities, Leontief utilities and Cobb–Douglas utilities are special cases of CES functions and thus are also homothetic.

On the other hand, quasilinear utilities are not always homothetic. E.g, the function $u(x,y) = x+\sqrt{y}$ cannot be represented as a homogeneous function.

== Intratemporally vs. intertemporally homothetic preferences ==
Preferences are intratemporally homothetic if, in the same time period, consumers with different incomes but facing the same prices and having identical preferences will demand goods in the same proportions.

Preferences are intertemporally homothetic if, across time periods, rich and poor decision makers are equally averse to proportional fluctuations in consumption.

Models of modern macroeconomics and public finance often assume the constant-relative-risk-aversion form for within period utility (also called the power utility or isoelastic utility). The reason is that, in combination with additivity over time, this gives homothetic intertemporal preferences and this homotheticity is of considerable analytic convenience (for example, it allows for the analysis of steady states in growth models). These assumptions imply that the elasticity of intertemporal substitution, and its inverse, the coefficient of (risk) aversion, are constant.

== Evidence ==
However, it is well known that in reality, consumption patterns change with economic affluence. This means that preferences are not actually homothetic. It has long been established that relative price changes affect people differently even if all face the same set of prices.

== See also ==
- Homothetic transformation
- Homogeneous function
