= Compensating variation =

Economic measure of utility change

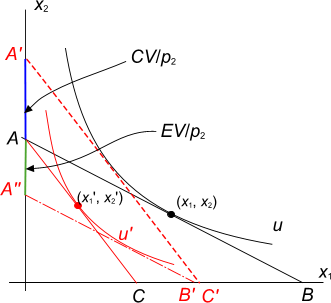
Compensating and equivalent variations

In economics, compensating variation (CV) is a measure of utility change introduced by John Hicks (1939). The term compensating in the name refers to the fact that the CV may be interpreted as the net revenue of a planner who must compensate the consumer for the price change after it occurs. Alternatively, the CV may be interpreted as the negative of the amount that the consumer would be just willing to accept from the planner to allow the price change to happen. In this sense, the CV is a measure, in units of money, of the change in consumer welfare, valued at the changed prices.

In terms of the expenditure function, $e(p,u)$, the compensating variation is defined by

$$\begin{aligned}CV(p^0, p^1) &= e(p^1, u^1) - e(p^1, u^0)\\
&= w - e(p^1, u^0)\end{aligned}$$

where $w$ is the consumer's wealth, $p^0$ and $p^1$ are the old and new prices respectively, and $u^0$ and $u^1$ are the old and new utility levels respectively. The CV can also be written in terms of the indirect utility function, $v(p,w)$, as

$$v(p^1, w - CV(p^0,p^1)) = u_0.$$

Written thus, the interpretation of CV as the negative of the amount of additional income that the consumer must receive in order to allow the price change to occur is clear.

Compensating variation is the metric behind Kaldor-Hicks efficiency; if the winners from a particular policy change can compensate the losers it is Kaldor-Hicks efficient, even if the compensation is not made.

Equivalent variation (EV) is a closely related measure. Whereas CV measures the welfare change in money at new prices, EV values the welfare change at the old prices, and can be thought of as the change in income that the consumer would be just willing to accept in order to forgo the price change. When a price change implies no income effect (as is the case for changes in prices of non-numeraire goods for quasilinear utility), then the EV and CV coincide, and the common value is called the change in (Marshallian) consumer surplus. That is, when there is no income effect, $CV = EV = \Delta CS,$ where $\Delta CS$ denotes change in consumer surplus.

== See also ==
- Equivalent variation (EV) is a closely related measure of welfare change.
