= Equivalent variation =

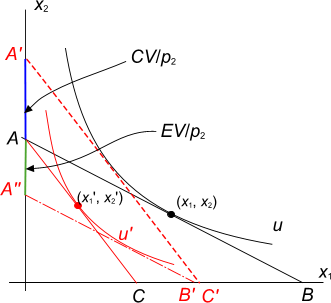
Compensating and equivalent variations

Equivalent variation (EV) is a measure of economic welfare changes associated with changes in prices. John Hicks (1939) is attributed with introducing the concept of compensating and equivalent variation.

The equivalent variation is the change in wealth, at current prices, that would have the same effect on consumer welfare as would the change in prices, with income unchanged. It is a useful tool when the present prices are the best place to make a comparison.

The value of the equivalent variation is given in terms of the expenditure function ($e(\cdot,\cdot)$) as

$EV = e(p_0, u_1) - e(p_1, u_1)$

$= e(p_0, u_1) - w_1$

where $w_1$ is the new wealth level, $p_0$ and $p_1$ are the old and new prices respectively, and $u_1$ are the new utility levels respectively.

Furthermore, if the wealth level does not change, $e(p_0,u_0)=w=e(p_1,u_1)$ since under both old and new utility levels and prices, a consumer exhausts their Budget Constraint by Walras's law, so

$EV = e(p_0, u_1) - e(p_0, u_0)$

However, the last equality only holds in the case where the wealth level of a consumer does not change and is thus only a special (albeit very useful and widely used) case of the definition of Equivalent Variation. It fails to hold e.g. when we consider an endowment economy, in which the wealth level is not exogenously given by but endogenous to the price.

== Value function form ==
Equivalently, in terms of the indirect utility function ($v(\cdot,\cdot)$),

$v(p_0,w+EV) = u_1$

This can be shown to be equivalent to the above by taking the expenditure function of both sides at $p_0$

$e(p_0,v(p_0,w+EV)) = e(p_0,u_1)$

$w+EV = e(p_0,u_1)$

$EV = e(p_0,u_1) -w$

One of the three identical equations above.

Compensating variation (CV) is a closely related measure of welfare change.
