= LNS =

LNS may refer to:

- East Lansing (Amtrak station), Amtrak station code
- L2TP Network Server in Layer 2 Tunneling Protocol VPNs
- Lancaster Airport (Pennsylvania), US, IATA code
- Lesch–Nyhan syndrome, an inherited genetic disorder
- League of National Security, a 1930s Australian far-right group also known as the White Army
- Liberation News Service, a former American underground press news agency
- Local nonsatiation, a property in microeconomics
- Logarithmic number system, an arithmetic system used for representing real numbers in digital hardware
