= Utility maximization problem =

Problem of allocation of money by consumers in order to most benefit themselves

In microeconomic theory, the utility maximization problem formalizes how a consumer allocates limited resources across different goods and services. The consumer is assumed to have well-defined preferences over all feasible bundles of goods and to be able to rank these bundles according to the level of utility they provide. Given a budget constraint determined by income and prices, the consumer chooses the most preferred bundle that is affordable. The utility maximization problem yields a systematic analysis of consumer demand and how it changes in response to changes in income or prices.

== The consumer problem ==
In microeconomics, a consumer is defined as an individual or a household consisting of one or more individuals. The consumer is the basic decision-making unit that determines which goods and services are purchased and in what quantities. Each day, millions of such choices are made, shaping the allocation of the trillions of dollars worth of goods and services produced annually in the world economy.

The utility maximization problem was first developed by utilitarian philosophers Jeremy Bentham and John Stuart Mill. It is formulated as follows: find the consumption bundle that maximizes the consumer's utility subject to his budget constraint.

== Consumption bundle ==
A consumption bundle is an element $x$ in $X$ $(x\in X)$ where $x\in R_+^k$. That is, every element $x$ in $X$ is a nonnegative orthant in $R^{k}$. A consumption bundle takes the following form: $x=(x_1, x_2,...,x_k)$ where $x_i\geq0$ $\forall i=1,..,k$. In simple words, the consumer cannot consume a negative amount of good.

== The budget constraint ==
The consumer maximizes his utility subject to his budget constraint. The budget constraint is the most simple and intuitive constraint faced by a consumer. The consumer may face a time constraint (the act of consuming takes time), a constraint of both time and money, an intertemporal budget constraint and many more. The economic problem originates from scarcity, therefore, when formulating and economic problem we will usually see some formulation of a constraint.

Assume there is a price vector $p$ where $p=(p_1,...,p_k)$ and $p_i>0 \forall i=1,..,k$. That is a price of a good is a positive number.

Furthermore, assume that the consumer's income is $I$. The budget set, or the set of all possible consumption bundles is:

$B(p, I) = \{x \in \mathbb{R}^k_+ | \mathbb{\Sigma}^k_{i=1} p_i x_i \leq I\}$.

In simple words, the consumer can choose a consumption bundle whose cost does not exceed his income.

In general, the set of all possible consumption bundles is assumed to be a closed and convex.

In a two good world, the basic set up of the consumer's budget constraint is: $p_1x_1+p_2x_2 \leq I$.

The budget set is homogenous of degree 0 in prices and income: $B(p, I) = B(\lambda p, \lambda I)$ since every $x$ that exhibits that ${\Sigma}^k_{i=1} \lambda p_i x_i \leq \lambda I\$ exhibits that $= {\Sigma}^k_{i=1} p_i x_i \leq I\$ (we can delete the $\lambda$ from both sides). That is, if the prices and income increase by the same rate, the budget set does not change.

== Preferences ==
The consumer preferences are defined over the of all possible bundles, that is, over$X$, which is assumed to be a closed and convex set. Every element $x$ in $X$ $(x\in X)$ is a nonnegative orthant in $R^{k}$. That is, every consumption bundle take the following form: $x=(x_1, x_2,...,x_k)$ where $x_i\geq0$ $\forall i=1,..,k$.

We want the consumer's preferences to create a well-defined order over the consumption bundles. Therefore, the some properties must be satisfied:

=== Completeness ===
Completeness of preferences indicates that all bundles in the consumption set can be compared by the consumer. For all $x$ and $y$ in $X$, either $x\succeq y$ or $y\succeq x$ or both. That is, the consumer prefers $x$ over $y$, or he prefers $y$ over $x$, or he is indifferent between $x$ and $y$.

Note that,

- If $x\succeq y$ holds but not $y\succeq x$ then we can learn that $x\succ y$. That is, the consumer prefers $x$ over $y$.
- If $x\succeq y$ and $y\succeq x$ hold, then we can learn that $x\thicksim y$. That is, the consumer is indifferent between $x$ and $y$.

=== Reflexive ===
For all $x$ in $X$, $x\succeq x$.

The consumer is indifferent between a consumption bundle and the same consumption bundle (a very trivial assumption).

=== Transitivity ===
For all $x, y , z \in X$, if $x\succeq y$ and $y\succeq z$, then $x\succeq z$.

Namely, if the consumer weakly prefers $x$ over $y$ and $y$ over $z$, then he weakly prefers $x$ over $z$.

=== Continuity ===
Suppose that $x \succ y$ and $x'\in B(x,\epsilon), y'\in B(y,\epsilon)$ then $x' \succ y'$

were $B$ is a ball with radius $\epsilon$ around the bundle, $\epsilon>0$ and $\epsilon\rightarrow 0$.

This assumption means that if the consumer prefers one bundle over the other, an infinitesimal change in the bundles will not change the preference relation. That is, the preferences are well established.

The four assumptions ensure that the consumer's preferences are well-defined and consistent. Moreover, if the four assumption hold, then the consumer's preferences can be represented by a continuous utility function.

- We will show that the lexicographic preference relation does not exhibits continuity: The consumer prefers the consumption bundle $x=(8,10)$ over the consumption bundle $y=(8,5)$. However, the consumer prefers $y'=(8+\epsilon,5)$ over $x'=(8,10+\epsilon)$ were $\epsilon>0$ and $\epsilon\rightarrow 0$. Consequently, there is no utility function that represents the lexicographic preference relation.

=== Monotonicity ===
The monotonicity assumption emphasizes that the goods are "good" and not "bad". That is, more of a good cannot make the consumers worse off. For a preference relation to be monotone, increasing the quantity of both goods should make the consumer strictly better off (increase their utility), and increasing the quantity of one good holding the other quantity constant should not make the consumer worse off.

The preference relation $\succcurlyeq$ is monotone if and only if

1. $x>y \Rightarrow x\succeq y$
2. $x \gg y \Rightarrow x \succ y$
- $x>y$ means that $x_i\geqslant y_i$ for all $i=1,..,k$ with at least one case for which $x_i > y_i$.
- $x \gg y$ means that $x_i > y_i$ for all $i=1,..,k$.

A preference relation is strictly monotone if any increase of good makes the consumer better off:

$x>y \Rightarrow x\succ y$.

=== Convexity ===
The assumption of convexity states that the consumer prefers "average" bundles over extreme ones.

More formally: suppose that $x\thicksim y$ and $z=\alpha x + (1-\alpha) y$ where $0 < \alpha <1$. Then, $z \succeq x, y$.

In simple words, suppose that the consumer is indifferent between $x$ and $y$, and $z$ is a bundle that is a weighted average of $x$ and $y$ with weights $\alpha$ and $(1-\alpha)$ respectively, then $z$ is no worse than $x$ or $y$.

If the preference relation exhibits strict convexity than $z\succ x,y$. That is, the consumer strictly prefers the average bundle.

== The consumer problem ==
The consumer chooses a bundle to maximize his utility subject to the budget constraint and the non-negativity condition.

More formally:

$\max_{x_1,..,x_k}\; u(x_1,..,x_k)$

$s.t. \sum p_i x_i \leq I$

$x_i \geq 0$ $\forall i=1,..,k$

The consumer's optimal choice $x(p,I)$ is the utility maximizing bundle of all bundles in the budget set.

$x(p, I) = \{x \in B(p,I)| U(x) \geq U(y) \forall y \in B(p,I)\}$.

$x(p,I)$ is set-valued and it is called the Marshallian demand correspondence.

- If $u$ is continuous and no commodities are free of charge, then $x(p,I)$ exists, but it is not necessarily unique.
- If the utility function also exhibits monotonicity then at the optimum, the consumer spends all his resources. The intuition for this result is straightforward: as long as the consumer has money he can by more goods and increase his utility (due to monotonicity).
- If the consumer's preferences are complete, reflexive, transitive, monotone, and strictly convex then the solution to the consumer problem is unique. Suppose that there are two solutions on the budget set. A bundle that is an average of the two solutions is preferable (due to strict convexity) and is on the budget set. That is, the two bundles were not optimal.
- If in addition to the previous, the utility function exhibits the Inada condition than the solution to the consumer problem in an internal one. That is, the consumer chooses to consume a positive amount from each good. If this is satisfied then $x(p,I)$ is called the Marshallian demand function. Otherwise,

Assuming an internal solution (the consumer consumes a positive amount from each good), the solution to the consumer problem is achieved using the Lagrange multiplier:

$\mathcal{L}\left( x_1,\ldots , x_n, \lambda \right) = u\left( x_1, \ldots, x_k \right) +{\lambda}({I}-{\sum\limits_{i=1}^k}p_i x_i)$

By differentiating $\mathcal{L}$ with respect to $x_i$ $(i=1,..,k)$ we obtain the first order conditions:

$u_i(\cdot)-\lambda p_i =0$ $\forall i=1,..,k$.

From the first order conditions we obtain that for each two goods $i, j$ , the Marginal Rate of Substitution is equal to the price ratio between these goods:

$MRS_{i,j}= \tfrac{u_i}{{u_j}}=\tfrac{p_i}{{p_j}}$ $\forall i,j \in (1,..,k)$.

By differentiating $\mathcal{L}$ with respect to $\lambda$ we obtain the budget constraint: ${I}-{\sum\limits_{i=1}^k}p_i x_i = 0$.

The first order condition, $MRS_{i,j}= \tfrac{p_i}{{p_j}}$, implies that at the optimum the maximal price the consumer is wiling to pay for a good, the "subjective" value of a good (in terms of another good) equals the "objective" price of that good (in terms of the other good).

Suppose that $MRS_{i,j}> \tfrac{p_i}{{p_j}}$. This implies that the consumer values an extra unit of $i$ more than the amount of $j$ he must give up to buy it. Hence, substituting toward good $i$ raises utility.

Note that if the consumer gives up $MRS_{i,j}$ units of $j$ to obtain one more unit of $i$ his utility remain unchanged.

== Reaction to changes in prices ==
The budget set is homogenous of degree zero, therefore, if the both prices and income increase by the same rate, the budget set does not change, and hence the optimal solution to the consumer's problem remain unchanged. That is, the demand for all goods is homogenous of degree 0 in income and prices.

When the prices of goods change, the optimal consumption of these goods will depend on the substitution and income effects. The substitution effect says that if the demand for both goods is homogeneous, when the price of one good decreases (holding the price of the other good constant) the consumer will consume more of this good and less of the other as it becomes relatively cheaper. The same goes if the price of one good increases, consumers will buy less of that good and more of the other.

The income effect occurs when the change in prices of goods cause a change in income. If the price of one good rises, then income is decreased (more costly than before to consume the same bundle), the same goes if the price of a good falls, income is increased (cheaper to consume the same bundle, they can therefore consume more of their desired combination of goods).

== Reaction to changes in income ==
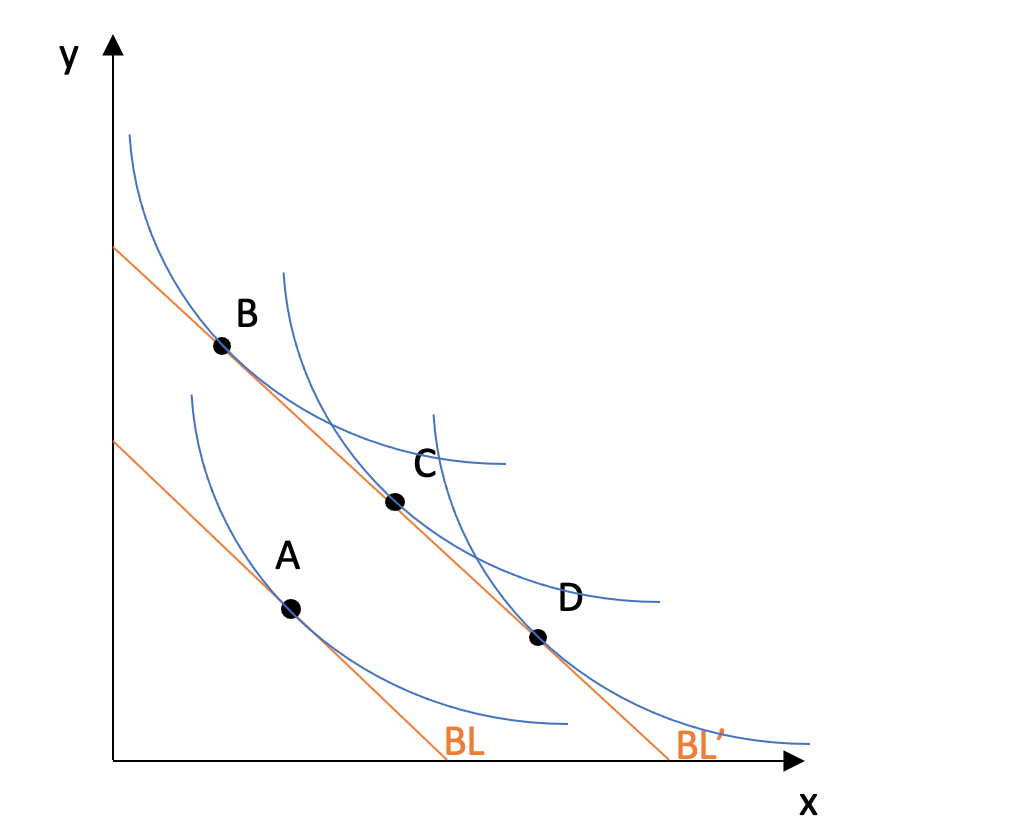
Figure 3: This figure shows how the optimal bundle of a consumer changes when their income is increased.

Suppose we have two goods: x and y. If the consumers income is increased their budget line is shifted outwards and they now have more income to spend on either good x, good y, or both depending on their preferences for each good. if both goods x and y were normal goods then consumption of both goods would increase and the optimal bundle would move from A to C (see Figure 5). If either x or y were inferior goods, then demand for these would decrease as income rises (the optimal bundle would be at point B or C).

If the consumer's preference relation exhibits monotonicity than the consumer spends his entire resources, as mentioned earlier. This means that at least one good is a normal good. Why? if he does not change the consumed amount of the goods (the goods are neutral), or if he lowers the consumed amount of some goods (some goods are inferior), than he cannot spend his entire income. That is, he must increase the consumed amount of at least one good.

== Solving the consumer problem ==
Assume that there are only two goods. For utility maximization there are five basic steps process to derive consumer's. optimal bundle and find the utility maximizing bundle of the consumer given prices, income, and preferences.

1) Check that utility function is monotone. That is, at the optimum, the consumer spends all of his income.

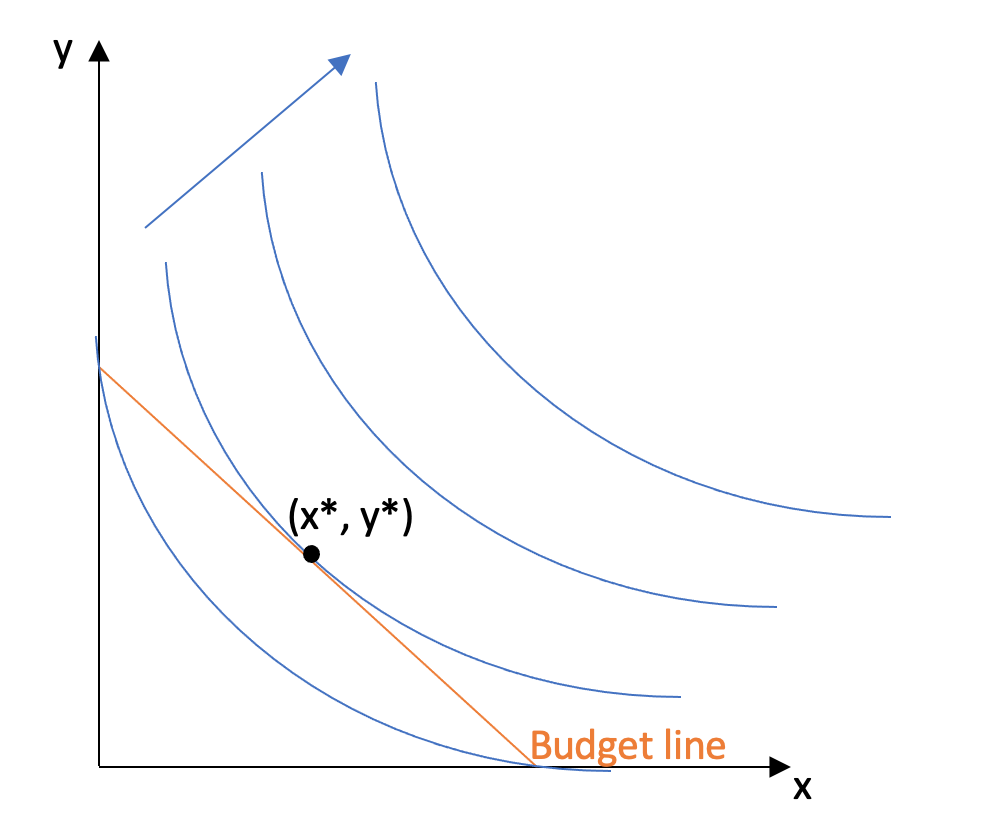
Figure 1: This figure shows the optimal amounts of goods x and y that maximize utility given a budget constraint.

2) Check that the utility function is quasi-concave. That is, the second order condition for maximum holds. In the two goods example the second-order condition implies that the utility function should be convex. In this case, optimal bundle lies in the tangency point between the utility function (See Figure 1).

3) Apply the first order condition to extract one of the variables.

4) Insert into the budget constraint to find the solution.

5) Check for negativity. Negativity must be checked for as the utility maximization problem can give an answer where the optimal demand of a good is negative, which in reality is not possible as this is outside the domain. If the demand for one good is negative, the optimal consumption bundle will be where 0 of this good is consumed and all income is spent on the other good (a corner solution).

== Examples ==
=== Exponential utility function ===
Assume that $u(x_1,x_2)=x_1^\alpha x_2$ where $\alpha <1$. Note that $MRS_{1,2} = \frac{\alpha x_2}{x_1}$. The MRS decreases when $x_2$ decreases and $x_1$ increases. That is, the utility function is convex. Therefore, the tangency point between the utility function and the budget set is the solution to the consumer's maximization problem.

$\max_{x_1,x_2}\; x_1^\alpha x_2$

$s.t. p_1 x_1 + p_2 x_2 \leq I$

$x_1,x_2 \geqslant 0$

The first order condition:

$MRS_{1,2} = \frac{\alpha x_2}{x_1}=\frac{p_1}{p_2} \Rightarrow \alpha x_2= {p_1 x_1}$

Inserting to the budget constraint:

$\alpha p_2 x_2 + p_2 x_2 = I \Rightarrow p_2 x_2(1+\alpha)=I \Rightarrow x_2 ^ * = \frac {I} {p_2 (1+\alpha)} \Rightarrow x_1 ^*= \frac {\alpha I} {p_1 (1+\alpha)}$

It can be easily seen that both goods are normal, that is, the demanded amount from each good increases with income. The demanded amount from each good decreases with each own price. Moreover, the good are not substitutes nor complements. Namely, the demand for one good does not change with a change in the other good's price.

=== Utility maximization of perfect complements ===
$u(x_1,x_2)=min \{\alpha x_1, x_2\}$

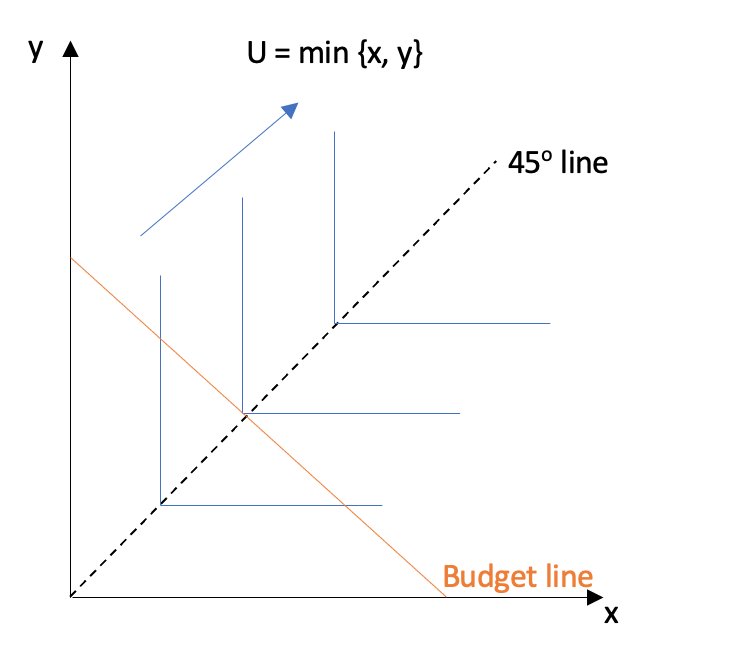
Figure 2: This shows the utility maximization problem with a minimum utility function.

For a minimum function with goods that are perfect complements, the same steps cannot be taken to find the utility maximizing bundle as it is a non differentiable function. Therefore, intuition must be used. The consumer will maximize their utility at the kink point in the highest indifference curve that intersects the budget line where $x_2=\alpha x_1$. The intuition is straightforward: The consumer increases his utility by one unit only if he increase his consumption by one unit of $y$ and $\tfrac{1}{\alpha}$ units of $x$ (to see that equate $min \{\alpha x_1, x_2\}$ to 1 and solve for $x$ and $y$ separately). Figure 2 depicts for $\alpha=1$.

By inserting the optimum condition into the budget constraint ($p_1 x_1 + p_2 x_2 = I$) we obtain that $p_1 x_1 + p_2 \alpha x_1 = I \Rightarrow x_1(p_1+ \alpha p_2 )=I \Rightarrow x_1^* = \frac {I}{(p_1+\alpha p_2)} \Rightarrow x_2^* = \frac {\alpha I}{(p_1+\alpha p_2)}$.

Note that the demand for good $i \in \{1,2\}$ increase with income ($I$). that is, the goods are normal goods. It decrease with its own price. that is, both goods are ordinary goods. Finally, the demand for good $i$ decrease with the price of good $j$ since good $i$ is a complement good to good $j$ .

=== Utility maximization of perfect substitutes ===
$u(x_1,x_2)=\alpha x_1+x_2$

That is, a unit of $x_2$ can be replaced by $\frac{1}{\alpha}$ units of $x_1$.

The Marginal Rate of Substitution is:

$MRS_{1,2} = \alpha$

while the price ratio is $\frac{p_1}{p_2}$.

If $MRS_{1,2} =\alpha >\frac{p_1}{p_2}$ , namely, the subjective value of $x_1$(in terms of $x_2$) is higher than its relative price (in terms of $x_2$), then the consumer spends his entire income on $x_1$. If the opposite occurs then the consumer spends his entire income on $x_2$, otherwise the consumer is indifferent between any combination of the two goods.

In sum:

$MRS_{1,2} =\alpha >\frac{p_1}{p_2} \Rightarrow x_1^* = \frac{I}{p_1}, x_2^* =0$

$MRS_{1,2} =\alpha <\frac{p_1}{p_2} \Rightarrow x_1^* =0, x_2^* = \frac{I}{p_2}$

$MRS_{1,2} =\alpha =\frac{p_1}{p_2} \Rightarrow x_1^* \in [0, \frac{I}{p_1}], x_2^* \in [\frac{I}{p_2},0]$

==== Intuition ====
Suppose a consumer finds listening to Australian rock bands AC/DC and Tame Impala perfect substitutes ($\alpha = 1$). This means that they are happy to spend all afternoon listening to only AC/DC, or only Tame Impala, or three-quarters AC/DC and one-quarter Tame Impala, or any combination of the two bands in any amount. Therefore, the consumer's optimal choice is determined entirely by the relative prices of listening to the two artists. If attending a Tame Impala concert is cheaper than attending the AC/DC concert, the consumer chooses to attend the Tame Impala concert, and vice versa. If the two concert prices are the same, the consumer is completely indifferent and may flip a coin to decide. To see this mathematically, differentiate the utility function to find that the MRS is constant - this is the technical meaning of perfect substitutes. As a result of this, the solution to the consumer's constrained maximization problem will not (generally) be an interior solution, and as such one must check the utility level in the boundary cases (spend entire budget on good x, spend entire budget on good y) to see which is the solution. The special case is when the (constant) MRS equals the price ratio (for example, both goods have the same price, and same coefficients in the utility function). In this case, any combination of the two goods is a solution to the consumer problem.

=== Utility maximization of substitutes ===
$u(x_1, x_2)= x_1^\alpha + x_2^\alpha$ $0< \alpha <1$

$\max_{x_1,x_2}\; x_1^\alpha + x_2^\alpha$

$s.t. p_1 x_1 + p_2 x_2 \leq I$

$x_1,x_2 \geqslant 0$

The first order condition:

$MRS_{1,2} = \biggl(\frac{x_2}{x_1}\biggr)^{1-\alpha} = \frac{p_1}{p_2} \Rightarrow \ x_2 =\biggl(\frac{p_1}{p_2}\biggr)^{\frac{1}{1-\alpha}} x_1 = kx_1$ where $k=\biggl(\frac{p_1}{p_2}\biggr)^{\frac{1}{1-\alpha}}$.

Inserting to the budget constraint:

$x_1\Biggl(p_1+p_2k\Biggr)=I$

$\Rightarrow x_1^*=\frac {I}{\biggl(p_1+p_2k\biggr)}$ $\Rightarrow x_2^*=\frac {Ik}{\biggl(p_1+p_2k\biggr)}$

It is easily verified that the demand for the two goods decrease with their own price. Moreover, it is easily verified that

$\frac{\partial x_1^*}{\partial p_2} = \frac{I \alpha}{1-\alpha} \cdot \frac{\left(\frac{p_1}{p_2}\right)^{\frac{1}{1-\alpha}}} {\left(p_1 + p_2 \left(\frac{p_1}{p_2}\right)^{\frac{1}{1-\alpha}}\right)^2}>0$, $\frac{\partial x_2^*}{\partial p_1} = -\frac{I \alpha}{1-\alpha} \cdot \frac{\left(\frac{p_1}{p_2}\right)^{\frac{1}{1-\alpha}}} {p_1 \left(p_1 + p_2 \left(\frac{p_1}{p_2}\right)^{\frac{1}{1-\alpha}}\right)^2}>0$.

That is, the goods are substitutes.

Finally, we can easily see that the goods are normal goods.

=== The quasi linear-utility ===
$u(x_1, x_2)= x_1^\alpha + x_2$ where $0< \alpha <1$.

$MRS_{1,2} = {\alpha x_1^{\alpha -1}} =\frac{p_1}{p_2} \Rightarrow \ x_1^{*} =\biggl(\frac{\alpha p_2}{p_1}\biggr)^{\frac{1}{1-\alpha}} \Rightarrow \ x_2^{*}=\frac {I-p_1 x_1^{*}}{p_2}$

Note that in internal solution, where the quantities of all goods are positive, good 1 is a neutral good, while good 2 is a normal good.

That is, if the consumer's income increases, all the extra income will be spent on good 2.

However, $x_2^{*}$ may be negative. In this case, $x_1^{*} = \frac {I}{p_1}$ and $x_2^{*}=0$.

=== Concave utility function ===
If the utility function is concave, than the point of tangency between the utility function and the budget line is the point that yields the consumer the lowest utility of all bundles on the budget line. In this case we have a corner solution:

if $u \biggl(\frac {I}{p_1},0\biggr)> u\biggl(0,\frac {I}{p_2}\biggr)$ then $x_1^{*} = \frac{I}{p_1}, x_2^{*}=0$. If the opposite holds then $x_1^{*}=0, x_2^{*} = \frac{I}{p_2}$. Otherwise, the consumer is indifferent between spending all his money on good 1 and spending all his money on good 2.

== Do consumers maximize utility? ==
Consumers are assumed However, due to bounded rationality, which prevents individuals from examining all the possible bundles and acquiring all the available information, for example due to lack of time, consumers sometimes pick bundles that do not necessarily maximize their utility.

Behavioral economist also challenge the theory of the rational consumer who maximizes utility subject to his budget constraint. For example, Daniel Kahneman and Amos Tversky conducted experiments that showed that people act irrationally. However, Robert Aumann challenges view and claims that rational acts should be distinguished from rational rules. The first refers to short-term utility maximization, while the latter refers to adhering to rules or habits that promote long-term utility maximization. When people face an unfamiliar situation they choose the action that maximizes their utility in most situation similar to the new one. This action does not necessarily maximize their utility in the new situation they face, but due to lack of time to study the new situation they resort to an action that "works" most of the time.

=== Dynamic utility maximization ===
The utility maximization bundle of the consumer is also not set and can change over time. For example, in the overlapping generation model the prices of the production factors (the price of labor - wage and the price of capital - the interest rate) change over time and so does the decision of the consumer. Consumer can modify their decisions due to a change of preference over time (for example in an optimal choice of consumption bundle over time under hyperbolic discounting) or change of states over time (in the case of a state dependent utility function).

== Bounded rationality ==
for further information see: Bounded rationality

In practice, a consumer may not always pick an optimal bundle. For example, it may require too much thought or too much time. Bounded rationality is a theory that explains this behaviour. Examples of alternatives to utility maximization due to bounded rationality are; satisficing, elimination by aspects and the mental accounting heuristic.

- The satisficing heuristic is when a consumer defines an aspiration level and looks until they find an option that satisfies this, they will deem this option good enough and stop looking.
- Elimination by aspects is defining a level for each aspect of a product they want and eliminating all other options that do not meet this requirement e.g. price under $100, colour etc. until there is only one product left which is assumed to be the product the consumer will choose.
- The mental accounting heuristic: In this strategy it is seen that people often assign subjective values to their money depending on their preferences for different things. A person will develop mental accounts for different expenses, allocate their budget within these, then try to maximize their utility within each account.

== Related concepts ==
The relationship between the utility function and Marshallian demand in the utility maximization problem mirrors the relationship between the expenditure function and Hicksian demand in the expenditure minimization problem. In expenditure minimization the utility level is given as well as the prices of goods, the role of the consumer is to find a minimum level of expenditure required to reach this utility level.

The utilitarian social choice rule is a rule that says that society should choose the alternative that maximizes the sum of utilities. While utility-maximization is done by individuals, utility-sum maximization is done by society.

== See also ==
- Welfare maximization
- Profit maximization
- Choice modelling
- Expenditure minimization problem
- Optimal decision
- Substitution effect
- Utility function
- Law of demand
- Marginal utility

== Bibliography ==
- Rubinstein, Ariel (2012). Lecture notes in microeconomic theory: the economic agent. Princeton paperbacks (2nd ed.). Princeton, N.J: Princeton University Press. ISBN 978-0-691-15413-8.
- Sarrias, Mauricio. "Lecture 2: The Consumer's Problem" (PDF). Retrieved 2026-02-16.
- Varian, Hal R. (1992). Microeconomic analysis (3rd ed.). W. W. Norton & Company. ISBN 0-393-95735-7.
