= Constant elasticity of substitution =

Concept in economics

Constant elasticity of substitution (CES) is a common specification of many production functions and utility functions in neoclassical economics. CES holds that the ability to substitute one input factor with another (for example labour with capital) to maintain the same level of production stays constant over different production levels. For utility functions, CES means the consumer has constant preferences of how they would like to substitute different goods (for example labour with consumption) while keeping the same level of utility, for all levels of utility. What this means is that both producers and consumers have similar input structures and preferences no matter the level of output or utility.

The vital economic element of the measure is that it provided the producer a clear picture of how to move between different modes or types of production, for example between modes of production relying on more labour. Several economists have featured in the topic and have contributed in the final finding of the constant. They include Tom McKenzie, John Hicks and Joan Robinson.

Specifically, it arises in a particular type of aggregator function which combines two or more types of consumption goods, or two or more types of production inputs into an aggregate quantity. This aggregator function exhibits constant elasticity of substitution.

== CES production function ==
Despite having several factors of production in substitutability, the most common are the forms of elasticity of substitution. On the contrary of restricting direct empirical evaluation, the constant Elasticity of Substitution are simple to use and hence are widely used. McFadden states that;

The constant E.S assumption is a restriction on the form of production possibilities, and one can characterize the class of production functions which have this property. This has been done by Arrow-Chenery-Minhas-Solow for the two-factor production case.

The CES production function is a neoclassical production function that displays constant elasticity of substitution. In other words, the production technology has a constant percentage change in factor (e.g. labour and capital) proportions due to a percentage change in marginal rate of technical substitution. The two factor (capital, labor) CES production function introduced by Solow, and later made popular by Arrow, Chenery, Minhas, and Solow is:

$$Q =  F\cdot \left(a \cdot K^\rho+(1-a) \cdot L^\rho\right)^{\frac{\upsilon}{\rho}}$$

where

- $Q$ = Quantity of output
- $F$ = Total factor productivity
- $a$ = Share parameter
- $K$, $L$ = Quantities of primary production factors (capital and labor)

Calculating the rate of technological substitution between K and L:

$RTS_{L,K}=\frac{F ({\frac{\upsilon}{\rho}-1})\cdot \left(a \cdot K^\rho+(1-a) \cdot L^\rho\right)^{\frac{\upsilon}{\rho}-1}\cdot a \cdot\rho\cdot L^{\rho-1}}{{F ({\frac{\upsilon}{\rho}-1})\cdot \left(a \cdot K^\rho+(1-a) \cdot L^\rho\right)^{\frac{\upsilon}{\rho}-1}\cdot a \cdot\rho \cdot K^{\rho-1}}}= (\frac{L}{K})^{\rho-1}$

Now we will derive the elasticity of substitution:

$\frac{K}{L} = RTS_{L,K}^\tfrac{1}{1-\rho}\Rightarrow ln(\frac{K}{L})=\tfrac{1}{1-\rho} ln(RTS_{L,K})$

$\frac{dln(\frac{K}{L})}{dln(RTS_{L,K})}=\frac{1}{1-\rho}$

- $\rho$ = ${\frac{\sigma-1}{\sigma}}$ = Substitution parameter
- $\sigma$ = ${\frac{1}{1-\rho}}$ = Elasticity of substitution
- $\upsilon$ = degree of homogeneity of the production function. Where $\upsilon$ = 1 (Constant return to scale), $\upsilon$ < 1 (Decreasing return to scale), $\upsilon$ > 1 (Increasing return to scale).

As its name suggests, the CES production function exhibits constant elasticity of substitution between capital and labor. Leontief, linear and Cobb–Douglas functions are special cases of the CES production function. That is,

- If $\rho$ approaches 1, we have a linear or perfect substitutes function;
- If $\rho$ approaches zero in the limit, we get the Cobb–Douglas production function;
- If $\rho$ approaches negative infinity we get the Leontief or perfect complements production function.

The general form of the CES production function, with n inputs, is:

$$Q =  F \cdot \left[\sum_{i=1}^n a_{i}X_{i}^{r}\ \right]^{\frac{1}{r}}$$

where

- $Q$ = Quantity of output
- $F$ = Total Factor Productivity
- $a_{i}$ = Share parameter of input i, $\sum_{i=1}^n a_{i} = 1$
- $X_i$ = Quantities of factors of production (i = 1,2...n)
- $s=\frac{1}{1-r}$ = Elasticity of substitution.

Extending the CES (Solow) functional form to accommodate multiple factors of production creates some problems. However, there is no completely general way to do this. Uzawa showed the only possible n-factor production functions (n>2) with constant partial elasticities of substitution require either that all elasticities between pairs of factors be identical, or if any differ, these all must equal each other and all remaining elasticities must be unity. This is true for any production function. This means the use of the CES functional form for more than 2 factors will generally mean that there is not constant elasticity of substitution among all factors.

Nested CES functions are commonly found in partial equilibrium and general equilibrium models. Different nests (levels) allow for the introduction of the appropriate elasticity of substitution.

== CES utility function ==
The same CES functional form arises as a utility function in consumer theory. For example, if there exist $n$ types of consumption goods $x_i$, then aggregate consumption $X$ could be defined using the CES aggregator:

$$X = \left[\sum_{i=1}^n a_{i}^{\frac{1}{s}}x_{i}^{\frac{s-1}{s}}\ \right]^{\frac{s}{s-1}}.$$

Here again, the coefficients $a_i$ are share parameters, and $s$ is the elasticity of substitution. Therefore, the consumption goods $x_i$ are perfect substitutes when $s$ approaches infinity and perfect complements when $s$ approaches zero. In the case where $s$ approaches one is again a limiting case where L'Hôpital's Rule applies. The CES aggregator is also sometimes called the Armington aggregator, which was discussed by Armington (1969).

CES utility functions are a special case of homothetic preferences.

The following is an example of a CES utility function for two goods, $x$ and $y$, with equal shares:

$$u(x,y) =(x^r + y^r)^{1/r}.$$

The expenditure function in this case is:

$$e(p_x,p_y,u) =(p_x^{r/(r-1)} + p_y^{r/(r-1)})^{(r-1)/r} \cdot u.$$

The indirect utility function is its inverse:

$$v(p_x,p_y,I) =(p_x^{r/(r-1)} + p_y^{r/(r-1)})^{(1-r)/r} \cdot I.$$

The demand functions are:

$$x(p_x,p_y,I) = \frac{p_x^{1/(r-1)}}{p_x^{r/(r-1)} + p_y^{r/(r-1)}}\cdot I,$$
$$y(p_x,p_y,I) = \frac{p_y^{1/(r-1)}}{p_x^{r/(r-1)} + p_y^{r/(r-1)}}\cdot I.$$

A CES utility function is one of the cases considered by Dixit and Stiglitz (1977) in their study of optimal product diversity in a context of monopolistic competition.

Note the difference between CES utility and isoelastic utility: the CES utility function is an ordinal utility function that represents preferences on sure consumption commodity bundles, while the isoelastic utility function is a cardinal utility function that represents preferences on lotteries. A CES indirect (dual) utility function has been used to derive utility-consistent brand demand systems where category demands are determined endogenously by a multi-category, CES indirect (dual) utility function. It has also been shown that CES preferences are self-dual and that both primal and dual CES preferences yield systems of indifference curves that may exhibit any degree of convexity.
