= Shephard's lemma =

Lemma

Shephard's lemma is a result in microeconomics having applications in the theory of the firm and in consumer choice. The lemma states that if indifference curves of the expenditure or cost function are convex, then the cost-minimizing point of a given good ($i$) with price $p_i$ is unique. The idea is that a consumer will buy a unique ideal amount of each item to minimize the price for obtaining a certain level of utility given the price of goods in the market.

The lemma is named after Ronald Shephard, who proved it using the distance formula in his book Theory of Cost and Production Functions in 1953. The equivalent result in the context of consumer theory was first derived by Lionel W. McKenzie in 1957. It states that the partial derivatives of the expenditure function with respect to the prices of goods equal the Hicksian demand functions for the relevant goods. Similar results had already been derived by John Hicks (1939) and Paul Samuelson (1947).

== Definition ==
In consumer theory, Shephard's lemma states that the demand for a particular good $i$ for a given level of utility $u$ and given prices $\mathbf{p}$, equals the derivative of the expenditure function with respect to the price of the relevant good:

$$h_i(\mathbf{p}, u) = \frac{\partial e (\mathbf{p}, u)}{ \partial p_i}$$

where $h_i(\mathbf{p}, u)$ is the Hicksian demand for good $i$, $e (\mathbf{p}, u)$ is the expenditure function, and both functions are in terms of prices (a vector $\mathbf{p}$) and utility $u$.

Likewise, in the theory of the firm, the lemma gives a similar formulation for the conditional factor demand for each input factor: the derivative of the cost function $c (\mathbf{w}, y)$ with respect to the factor price:

$$x_i(\mathbf{w}, y) = \frac{\partial c (\mathbf{w}, y)}{ \partial w_i}$$

where $x_i(\mathbf{w}, y)$ is the conditional factor demand for input $i$, $c (\mathbf{w}, y)$ is the cost function. Both functions are in terms of factor prices (a vector $\mathbf{w}$) and output $y$.

Although Shephard's original proof used the distance formula, modern proofs of Shephard's lemma use the envelope theorem.

== Proof for the differentiable case ==
The proof is stated for the two good cases for ease of notation. The expenditure function $e(p_{1},p_{2},u)$ is the value function of the constrained optimization problem characterized by the following Lagrangian:

$$\mathcal{L}=p_{1}x_{1} + p_{2}x_{2} + \lambda(u-U(x_{1},x_{2}))$$

By the envelope theorem the derivatives of the value function $e(p_{1},p_{2},u)$ with respect to the parameter $p_{1}$ are:

$$\frac{\partial e}{\partial p_{1}}=\frac{\partial \mathcal{L}}{\partial p_{1}}=x_{1}^{h}$$

where $x_{1}^{h}$ is the minimizer (i.e. the Hicksian demand function for good 1). This completes the Proof.

== Application ==
Shephard's lemma gives a relationship between expenditure (or cost) functions and Hicksian demand. The lemma can be re-expressed as Roy's identity, which gives a relationship between an indirect utility function and a corresponding Marshallian demand function.

== See also ==
- Hotelling's lemma
- Convex preferences
