= Cobb–Douglas production function =

Economic formula of productivity

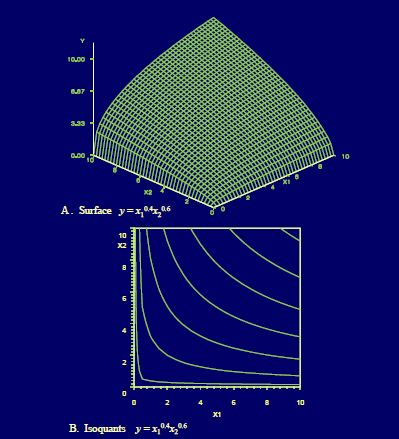
A wire-grid Cobb–Douglas production surface with isoquants

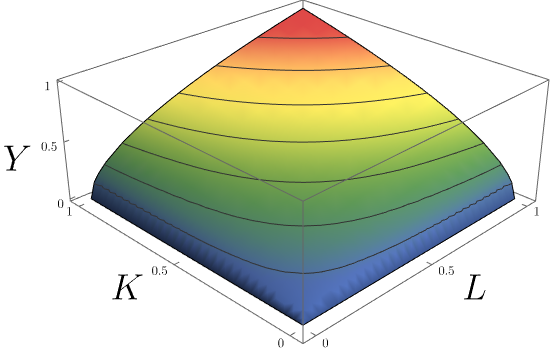
A two-input Cobb–Douglas production function with isoquants

In economics and econometrics, the Cobb–Douglas production function is a particular functional form of the production function, widely used to represent the relationship between the amounts of two or more inputs (particularly physical labor and capital) and the amount of output that can be produced by those inputs. The Cobb–Douglas form was developed and tested against statistical evidence by Charles Cobb and Paul Douglas between 1927 and 1947; according to Douglas, the functional form itself was developed earlier by Philip Wicksteed.

== Formulation ==
The most common version of the function is given by:

$$Y(L,K)=AL^\alpha K^\beta$$

where:

- Y is the total production output
- L is the labor input
- K is the capital input
- A is the total factor productivity
- $0<\alpha<1$ is the labor elasticity of output
- $0<\beta<1$ is the capital elasticity of output

== History ==
Paul Douglas explained that his first formulation of the Cobb–Douglas production function was developed in 1927; when seeking a functional form to relate estimates he had calculated for workers and capital, he spoke with mathematician and colleague Charles Cobb, who suggested a function of the form $Y=AL^{\alpha}K^{1-\alpha}$, previously used by Knut Wicksell, Philip Wicksteed, and Léon Walras, although Douglas only acknowledges Wicksteed and Walras for their contributions. Not long after Knut Wicksell's death in 1926, Paul Douglas and Charles Cobb implemented the Cobb–Douglas function in their work covering the subject manner of producer theory for the first time. Estimating this using least squares, he obtained a result for the exponent of labor of 0.75—which was subsequently confirmed by the National Bureau of Economic Research to be 0.741. Later work in the 1940s prompted them to allow for the exponents on $L$ and $K$ to vary, resulting in estimates that subsequently proved to be very close to improved measure of productivity developed at that time.

A major criticism at the time was that estimates of the production function, although seemingly accurate, were based on such sparse data that it was hard to give them much credibility. Douglas remarked "I must admit I was discouraged by this criticism and thought of giving up the effort, but there was something which told me I should hold on." The breakthrough came in using US census data, which was cross-sectional and provided a large number of observations. Douglas presented the results of these findings, along with those for other countries, at his 1947 address as president of the American Economic Association. Shortly afterwards, Douglas went into politics and was stricken by ill health, resulting in little further development on his side. However, two decades later, his production function was widely used, being adopted by economists such as Paul Samuelson and Robert Solow. The Cobb–Douglas production function is especially notable for being the first time an aggregate or economy-wide production function had been developed, estimated, and then presented to the profession for analysis; it marked a landmark change in how economists approached macroeconomics from a microeconomics perspective.

== Capital and Labor Elasticity ==
The factor of production elasticity of output is the percentage change in output that follows from a 1% change in that factor of production, holding constant all the other factors of production as well as the total factor productivity.

In the Cobb–Douglas production function, the labor elasticity of output is $\alpha$, while the capital elasticity of output is $\beta$.

$\dfrac{\partial Y/Y}{\partial{L}/L} = \alpha$

$\dfrac{\partial Y/Y}{\partial{K}/K} = \beta$

Proof

$\dfrac{\partial Y/Y}{\partial{L}/L} = \dfrac{\partial Y}{\partial L} \dfrac{L}{Y} = \alpha A L^{\alpha-1} K^\beta \dfrac{L}{Y} = \alpha \dfrac{A L^\alpha K^\beta}{L} \dfrac{L}{Y} = \alpha \dfrac{Y}{L} \dfrac{L}{Y} = \alpha$

A similar proof holds for capital.

Example

If α = 0.45, a 1% increase in labor usage would lead to approximately a .45% increase in output.

== Marginal products ==
The marginal product of labor is $MPL=\frac{\partial Y}{\partial L}=\alpha\frac{Y}{L}>0$.

The marginal product of capital is $MPK=\frac{\partial Y}{\partial K}=\beta\frac{Y}{K}>0$.

That is, increasing labor always leads to an increase in output, increasing capital always leads to an increase in output, and increasing the total factor productivity $A$ increases both the marginal product of labor and the marginal product of capital.

Proof

The marginal product of labor, $MPL$, corresponds to the derivative of the production function with respect to labor:

$$MPL=\frac{\partial Y}{\partial L} = \alpha A L^{\alpha-1} K^\beta = \alpha \frac{A L^\alpha K^\beta}{L} = \alpha \frac{Y}{L}$$

Because $\alpha>0$, $Y>0$ and $L>0$, it follows that the marginal product of labor is always positive. A similar proof holds for capital.

Example

Suppose $A=3, L=36, \alpha=0.5, K=25, \beta=0.5$.

The function then reads $Y=3 \cdot 36^{0.5} \cdot 25^{0.5}=90$.

The marginal product of labor equals $MPL=\frac{\partial Y}{\partial L}=\alpha\frac{Y}{L}=0.5\frac{90}{36}=1.25$.

Increasing labor to $L=37$ leads to a production $Y$ of $\approx 91.24$, an increase of $\approx 1.24$.

== Law of diminishing returns ==
The Cobb–Douglas production function satisfies the law of diminishing returns; that is, the marginal product of a factor of production, while always positive, is declining. As the input of labor of capital is increased while holding the other factor of production and the total factor productivity constant, the rate at which the output increases diminishes.

This can be described by the formulas:

$$\frac{\partial MPL}{\partial L} = \frac{\partial^2 Y}{\partial L^2} < 0$$
$$\frac{\partial MPK}{\partial K} = \frac{\partial^2 Y}{\partial K^2} < 0$$

Proof

Taking the derivative of the marginal product of labor with respect to labor (i.e., taking the second derivative of the production function with respect to labor), gives:

$$\frac{\partial MPL}{\partial L} = \frac{\partial^2 Y}{\partial L^2} = \frac{\partial}{\partial L} ( A L^{\alpha-1} \alpha K^\beta) = A L^{\alpha-2} \alpha (\alpha-1) K^\beta =  \alpha (\alpha-1) A K^\beta \frac{L^\alpha}{L^2} = \alpha (\alpha-1) \frac{Y}{L^2}$$

Because $\alpha<1$, then $\alpha-1<0$ and therefore $\dfrac{\partial MPL}{\partial L}<0$.

Another way to see why the law of diminishing returns is satisfied is by writing the marginal product of labor as: $MPL=\alpha A L^{\alpha-1} K^\beta = \frac{\alpha A K^\beta}{L^{1-\alpha}}$.
Because $0 < \alpha < 1$ it follows that the marginal product of labor shrinks as the input of labor is increased.

Example

Suppose $A=3, L=36, \alpha=0.5, K=25, \beta=0.5$

Production is $Y=3 \cdot 36^{0.5} \cdot 25^{0.5}=90 $$.

Increasing labor by 10 to $L=46$ leads to a production $Y$ of $\approx 101.73$, an increase of $\approx 11.73$.

Further increasing labor by 10 to $L=56$ leads to a production $Y$ of $\approx 112.25$, an increase of $\approx 10.52$.

== Marginal Rate of Technical Substitution ==
The marginal rate of technical substitution gives the amount by which the input of one factor of production must change so that total production output remains constant after a change in another factor of production. In other words, it is the absolute value of the slope of the isoquant for the current total production output.

$$MRTS(L,K) = \dfrac{MPL}{MPK} = \dfrac{\alpha}{\beta} \dfrac{K}{L}$$

Proof

The isoquant for a fixed total production output $\bar{Y}$ is given by $\bar{Y}=AL^\alpha K^\beta$ which can be rewritten as $K=\bar{Y}^{1/\beta}A^{-1/\beta}L^{-\alpha/\beta}$

With labor on the x-axis and capital on the y-axis the slope of the isoquant becomes:

$$\dfrac{dK}{dL}=\dfrac{d(\bar{Y}^{1/\beta}A^{-1/\beta}L^{-\alpha/\beta})}{dL}=\bar{Y}^{1/\beta}A^{-1/\beta} \cdot \left(-\dfrac{\alpha}{\beta}\right) \cdot L^{(-\alpha/\beta)-1}=\left(-\dfrac{\alpha}{\beta}\right) \bar{Y}^{1/\beta}A^{-1/\beta}L^{-\alpha/\beta} \cdot \frac{1}{L} =-\dfrac {\alpha K}{\beta L}$$

$$MRTS(L, K)= \left\vert \frac{dK}{dL} \right\vert = \left\vert -\frac{\alpha K}{\beta L} \right\vert = \frac{\alpha K}{\beta L}$$

As $\alpha$, $\beta$, $L$ and $K$ are all positive numbers and the marginal rate of technical substitution is the absolute value of the slope of the isoquant.

The marginal products of labor and capital are $MPL=\alpha \dfrac {Y} {L}$ and $MPK=\beta \dfrac {Y} {K}$ and from this it follows that:

$$\dfrac{MPL}{MPK} =\dfrac {\alpha Y/L} {\beta Y/K}=\dfrac {\alpha YK} {\beta YL}=\dfrac {\alpha K} {\beta L}=MRTS(L,K)$$

Example

Suppose $A=3, L=36, \alpha=0.5, K=25, \beta=0.5$

Production is $Y=3 \cdot 36^{0.5} \cdot 25^{0.5}=90 $$.

The Marginal Rate of Technical Substitution is $MRTS(L,K)=\dfrac{\alpha K}{\beta L}=\dfrac{0.5 \cdot 25}{0.5 \cdot 36} = 0.6944444$.

$Y=3 \cdot 35^{0.5} \cdot 25^{0.5}=88.7412 $$

$Y=3 \cdot 35^{0.5} \cdot (25+0.6944444)^{0.5}=89.96527 $$

== Elasticity of Substitution ==
The elasticity of substitution is constant and equal to 1.

Proof

$\sigma_{LK} = \dfrac{d\ln(\frac{K}{L})}{d\ln(MRTS)} = \dfrac{d\ln(MRTS\frac{\beta}{\alpha})}{d\ln(MRTS)} = \dfrac{\dfrac{d\ln(MRTS\frac{\beta}{\alpha})}{dMRTS}}{\dfrac{d\ln(MRTS)}{dMRTS}} = \dfrac{1}{MRTS \frac{\beta}{\alpha}} \cdot \frac{\beta}{\alpha} \cdot MRTS = 1$

== Cross derivatives ==
An increase in the input of labor raises the marginal product of capital, while an increase in the input of capital raises the marginal product of labor.

In formulas: $\dfrac{\partial MPK}{\partial L}>0$; $\dfrac{\partial MPL}{\partial K}>0$.

Proof

By taking the partial derivative of the marginal product of labor with respect to capital, that is, the cross-derivative of output with respect to labor and capital, it is possible to study what happens to the marginal product of labor when the input of capital is increased:

$\dfrac{\partial MPL}{\partial K} = \dfrac{\partial^2 Y}{\partial L \partial K} = \dfrac{\partial}{\partial K} ( A \alpha L^{\alpha-1} K^{\beta} ) = A \alpha L^{\alpha-1} \beta K^{\beta-1} = A \alpha \beta \dfrac{L^\alpha K^\beta}{L K} = \alpha \beta \dfrac{Y}{LK}$

Since $\dfrac{\partial MPL}{\partial K}>0$, an increase in capital raises the marginal product of labor.

An analogous proof holds for labor.

Example

Suppose $A=3, L=36, \alpha=0.5, K=25, \beta=0.5$

Production is $Y=3 \cdot 36^{0.5} \cdot 25^{0.5}=90$.

Increasing labor by 10 to $L=46$ leads to a production $Y$ of $\approx 101.73$, an increase of $11.73$.

Now suppose $A=3, L=36, \alpha=0.5, K=36, \beta=0.5$.

Production $Y$ is $108$.

Increasing labor by 10 to $L=46$ leads to a production $Y$ of $\approx 122.08$, an increase of $14.08$

== Returns to scale ==
If $\alpha+\beta=1$, then returns to scale are constant, meaning that an increase of labor and capital by a factor $x$ will lead to an increase in production of the same factor $x$, that is $Y(xL,xK)=xY(L,K)$.

If $\alpha+\beta<1$, then returns to scale are decreasing, meaning that an increase of labor and capital by a factor $x$ will lead to an increase in production by a factor smaller than that of $x$, that is $Y(xL,xK)<xY(L,K)$.

If $\alpha+\beta>1$, then returns to scale are increasing, meaning that an increase in labor and capital by a factor $x$ will lead to an increase in production by a factor greater than that of $x$, that is, $Y(xL,xK)>xY(L,K)$.

Proof

$Y(xL,xK) = A (xL)^\alpha (xK)^\beta = A x^\alpha L^\alpha k^\beta K^\beta = A x^{\alpha+\beta} L^\alpha K^\beta = x^{\alpha+\beta} Y(L,K)$

If ${\alpha+\beta}=1$ then $Y(xL,xK) = x Y(L, K)$.

If ${\alpha+\beta}<1$ then $x^{\alpha+\beta} Y(L,K) < x Y(L, K)$.

If ${\alpha+\beta}>1$ then $x^{\alpha+\beta} Y(L,K) > x Y(L, K)$.

== Remuneration under perfect competition ==
Under constant returns to scale, $\beta=1-\alpha$ and $Y=L\cdot MPL + K\cdot MPK$.

In a perfect competition the marginal product of a production factor equals its price. Therefore, $MPL=w$ and $MPK=r$ where $w$ is the wage rate and $r$ is the price of capital, the real interest rate.

The total production can be written as follows: $Y=L\cdot w + K\cdot r$.

That is, the value of production is divided between remuneration for labor and remuneration for capital.

== Generalized form ==
In its generalized form, the Cobb–Douglas function models more than two goods. The Cobb–Douglas function may be written as

$$f(x)=A \prod_{i=1}^n x_i^{\lambda_i}, \qquad x = (x_1, \ldots, x_n).$$

where

- A is an efficiency parameter
- n is the total number of input variables (goods)
- x_{1}, ..., x_{n} are the (non-negative) quantities of good consumed, produced, etc.
- $\lambda_i$ is an elasticity parameter for good i

== Criticisms ==
The function has been criticised for its lack of foundation. Cobb and Douglas were influenced by statistical evidence that appeared to show that labor and capital shares of total output were constant over time in developed countries; they explained this by statistical fitting least-squares regression of their production function. It is now widely accepted that labor share is declining in industrialized economies. The production function contains a principal assumption that may not always provide the most accurate representation of a country's productive capabilities and supply-side efficiencies. This assumption is a "constant share of labor in output," which may not be effective when applied to cases of countries whose labor markets are growing at significant rates. Another issue within the fundamental composition the Cobb–Douglas production function is the presence of simultaneous equation bias. When competition is presumed, the simultaneous equation bias has impact on all function types involving firm decisions – including the Cobb–Douglas function. In some cases this simultaneous equation bias doesn't appear. However, it is apparent when least squares asymptotic approximations are used.

However, many modern authors have developed models which give microeconomically based Cobb–Douglas production functions, including many New Keynesian models. It is nevertheless a mathematical mistake to assume that just because the Cobb–Douglas function applies at the microeconomic level, it also always applies at the macroeconomic level. Similarly, it is not necessarily the case that a macro Cobb–Douglas applies at the disaggregated level. An early microfoundation of the aggregate Cobb–Douglas technology based on linear activities was dervied by Houthakker in a paper published in 1955. The Cobb–Douglas production function is inconsistent with modern empirical estimates of the elasticity of substitution between capital and labor, which suggest that capital and labor are gross complements. A 2021 meta-analysis of 3186 estimates concludes that "the weight of evidence accumulated in the empirical literature emphatically rejects the Cobb–Douglas specification."

In a 1974 article, economist Anwar Shaikh demonstrates that any economic data, together with the assumption of a constant share of production between capital and labor and respecting the assumption of constant returns to scale, can be expressed in the form of a Cobb-Douglas production function; he shows that the Cobb-Douglas function is in fact governed by algebraic relationships concerning the distribution of value added between capital and labor, and that the production function therefore does not ultimately rely on any genuine assumption about production itself. To demonstrate this, Anwar Shaikh constructs a Cobb-Douglas function based on fictitious data (data tracing the word “Humbug”), which is strongly correlated with the underlying fictitious production function (R² = .993). In the same article, he also shows that Robert Solow’s article ‘Technical Change and the Aggregate Production Function’ paved the way for the neoclassical approach in the economic analysis of growth, makes the same mistake."

== Cobb–Douglas utilities ==
The Cobb–Douglas function is often used as a utility function. Utility $\tilde{u}$ is a function of the quantities $x_i$ of the $n$ goods consumed:

$$\tilde{u}(x)=   \prod_{i=1}^n x_i^{\lambda_i}$$

Utility functions represent ordinal preferences and do not have natural units, unlike production functions. As the result, a monotonic transformation of a utility function represents the same preferences. Unlike with a Cobb–Douglas production function, where the sum of the exponents determines the degree of economies of scale, the sum can be normalized to one for a utility function because normalization is a monotonic transformation of the original utility function. Thus, let us define $\lambda = \sum_{i=1}^n \lambda_i$ and $\alpha_i = \frac{\lambda_i}{ \lambda}$, so $\sum_{i=1}^n \alpha_i = 1$, and write the utility function as:

$$u(x) = \prod_{i =1}^n x_i^{\alpha_i}$$

The consumer maximizes utility subject to the budget constraint that the cost of the goods is less than her wealth $w$. Letting $p_i$ denote the goods' prices, she solves:

$$\max_{x_i} \prod_{i=1}^n x_i^{\alpha_i} \quad \text{ subject to the constraint } \quad \sum_{i=1}^n p_i x_i= w$$
The Marginal Rate of Substitution between each two goods is
$$MRS_{i,j}=\frac{\alpha_i}{\alpha_j}{x_j \over x_i}={p_i \over p_j}\Rightarrow
p_j x_j={p_i \alpha_j\over   \alpha_i}x_i$$
By inserting to the budget constrain we obtain
$$p_i x_i + \textstyle \sum_{j\neq i}^n \displaystyle p_i x_i \frac{\alpha_j}{\alpha_i} = w$$
$$\Rightarrow p_i x_i(1+\sum_{j\neq i}^n \frac{\alpha_j}{\alpha_i})=w
\Rightarrow p_i x_i\frac{(\alpha_i +\sum_{j\neq i}^n \alpha_j)} {\alpha_i}=w
\Rightarrow p_i x_i\frac{1} {\alpha_i}=w$$
$$\Rightarrow x_i^*=\frac{\alpha_i w }{p_i}  \forall i$$

Note that $p_i x^*_i = \alpha_i w$, the consumer spends fraction $\alpha_i$ of her wealth on good i.

Also note that each good is affected solely by its own price. That is, any two goods are not substitute goods nor complementary goods. Namely, their cross elasticity equals to zero and the cross demand function of any good is described by a vertical line.

Finally, note that when the income increase by some percent the demand for the good increase by the same percent. That is, the elasticity of the demand with respect to income equals 1 and therefore, the Engel curve is a straight line starting from the origin.

Note that this is the solution for either $u(x)$ or $\tilde{u}(x),$ since the same preferences generate the same demand.

The indirect utility function can be calculated by substituting the demands $x_i$ into the utility function. Define the constant $K= \prod_{i =1}^n \alpha_i^{\alpha_i}$ and we get:

$$v(p,w) = \prod_{i =1}^n \left( \frac{w \alpha_i}{p_i} \right)^{\alpha_i}
=
\frac{  \prod_{i =1}^n  w^{\alpha_i}\cdot \prod_{i =1}^n \alpha_i^{\alpha_i} }{ \prod_{i =1}^n p_i ^{\alpha_i}} =K \left(\frac{ w}{\prod_{i =1}^n p_i ^{\alpha_i}} \right)$$

which is a special case of the Gorman polar form. The expenditure function is the inverse of the indirect utility function:

$$e(p, u) =  (1/K)\prod_{i=1}^n p_i^{\alpha_i} u$$

The Marshallian demand function

== Various representations of the production function ==
The Cobb–Douglas function form can be estimated as a linear relationship using the following expression:

$$\ln(Y) = a_0 + \sum_i a_i \ln(I_i)$$

where

- $Y = \text{output}$
- $I_i = \text{inputs}$
- $a_i = \text{model coefficients}$

The model can also be written as

$$Y = e^{a_0} (I_1)^{a_1} \cdot (I_2)^{a_2} \cdots$$

As noted, the common Cobb–Douglas function used in economic modelling is

$$Y =A L^\alpha K^\beta$$

where $L$ is labor, $K$ is capital and $A$ is a constant expressing the total factor productivity. When the model exponents sum to one, the production function is first-order homogeneous, which implies constant returns to scale—that is, if all inputs are scaled by a common factor greater than zero, output will be scaled by the same factor.

== Relationship to the CES production function ==
The constant elasticity of substitution (CES) production function (in the two-factor case) is

$$Y = A \left ( \alpha L^\gamma + (1-\alpha) K^\gamma \right )^{1/\gamma},$$

in which the limiting case γ = 0 corresponds to a Cobb–Douglas function, $Y=AL^\alpha K^{1-\alpha},$ with constant returns to scale.

To see this, the log of the CES function:

$$\ln(Y) = \ln(A) + \frac{1}{\gamma} \ln \left (\alpha L^\gamma + (1-\alpha) K^\gamma \right )$$

can be taken to the limit by applying L'Hôpital's rule:

$$\lim_{\gamma\to 0} \ln(Y) = \ln(A) + \alpha \ln(L) + (1-\alpha) \ln(K).$$

Therefore, $Y=AL^\alpha K^{1-\alpha}$.

=== Translog production function ===
The translog production function is an approximation of the CES function by a second-order Taylor polynomial in the variable $\gamma$ about $\gamma = 0$, i.e. the Cobb–Douglas case. The name translog stands for "transcendental logarithmic." It is often used in econometrics for the fact that it is linear in the parameters, which means ordinary least squares could be used if inputs could be assumed exogenous.

In the two-factor case above the translog production function is

$$\begin{align}
\ln(Y) &= \ln(A) + \alpha \ln(L) + (1-\alpha) \ln(K) + \frac{1}{2} \gamma \alpha (1 - \alpha) \left[ \ln(L) - \ln(K) \right]^2 \\
&= \ln(A) + a_L \ln(L) + a_K \ln(K) + b_{LL} \ln^2(L) + b_{KK} \ln^{2}(K) + b_{LK} \ln(L) \ln(K)
\end{align}$$

where $a_L$, $a_K$, $b_{LL}$, $b_{KK}$, and $b_{LK}$ are defined appropriately. In the three factor case, the translog production function is:

$$\begin{align}
\ln(Y) & = \ln(A) + a_L\ln(L) + a_K\ln(K) + a_M\ln(M) + b_{LL}\ln^2(L) +b_{KK}\ln^2(K) + b_{MM}\ln^2(M) \\
& {} \qquad \qquad + b_{LK}\ln(L)\ln(K) + b_{LM}\ln(L)\ln(M) + b_{KM}\ln(K)\ln(M) \\
&  = f(L,K,M).
\end{align}$$

where $A$ = total factor productivity, $L$ = labor, $K$ = capital, $M$ = materials and supplies, and $Y$ = output.

== See also ==
- Leontief production function
- Production–possibility frontier
- Production theory
