= Charles Cobb (economist) =

American mathematician and economist

- Born: September 17, 1875; Plymouth, Massachusetts
- Died: March 2, 1949 (aged 73); Cambridge, Massachusetts
- Education: University of Michigan
- Known for: Cobb–Douglas function
- Scientific career
- Fields: Mathematics; Economics
- Workplaces: Amherst College
- Doctoral advisor: Walter Burton Ford

Charles Wiggins Cobb (September 17, 1875 – March 2, 1949) was an American mathematician and economist and a 1912 Ph.D. graduate of the University of Michigan. He published many works on both subjects, however he is most famous for developing the Cobb–Douglas production function in economics. He worked on this project with the economist Paul H. Douglas while lecturing at Amherst College in Massachusetts. In 1928, Charles Cobb and Paul Douglas published a study in which they modeled the growth of the American economy during the period 1899–1922. They considered a simplified view of the economy in which production of output is determined by the amount of labor involved and the amount of capital used. While there are many other factors affecting economic performance, their model proved to be remarkably accurate. He also authored a number of books and pamphlets in his time including, 'The asymptotic development for a certain integral function of zero order,' in 1913, while working to attain his doctorate in mathematics.
