= Eugen Slutsky =

Russian mathematical statistician and economist

Evgeny Slutsky
- Historical photo of Evgeny Slutsky
- Born: Evgeny Evgenievich Slutsky; 7 April 1880; Novoye, Yaroslavl Governorate, Russian Empire
- Died: 10 March 1948 (aged 67); Moscow, Russian SFSR, Soviet Union
- Education: Kiev University; Technical University of Munich
- Known for: Slutsky's theorem Slutsky equation
- Scientific career
- Fields: Mathematics, economics
- Workplaces: TsSU; Steklov Institute of Mathematics

Evgeny "Eugen" Evgenievich Slutsky (Russian: Евге́ний Евге́ньевич Слу́цкий; 7 April [O.S. 26 March] 1880 – 10 March 1948) was Soviet mathematical statistician, economist and political economist. He is primarily known for the Slutsky equation and the Slutsky–Yule effect.

== Early life ==
Slutsky studied in the department of physics and mathematics at Kiev University. In 1901, he was expelled from the university and conscripted into the army for participating in student protests. He was allowed to return to his studies, but was again expelled in 1902 and prohibited from studying at any university in the Russian Empire.

From 1902 to 1905, he studied in the department of engineering at the Technical University of Munich. He was allowed to resume studies in the Russian Empire in 1905 where he enrolled in department of law at Kiev University where he sought to apply mathematics in economics research. He graduated in 1911 with a gold medal.

In 1917, he received a degree in political economy from the University of Moscow.

== Academic career ==
In 1911, he joined the faculty at Kiev Institute of Commerce. He became full professor in 1920.

In 1926, he began working for the Central Statistical Board in Moscow.

In 1934, he began working for the Mathematical Institute of the University of Moscow. In 1938, he became a member of the Mathematical Institute of the Academy of Sciences of the U.S.S.R.

== Work in economics ==
Slutsky is principally known for work in deriving the relationships embodied in the Slutsky equation widely used in microeconomic consumer theory for separating the substitution effect and the income effect of a price change on the total quantity of a good demanded following a price change in that good, or in a related good that may have a cross-price effect on the original good quantity. There are many Slutsky analogs in producer theory.

He is less well known by Western economists than some of his contemporaries, due to his own changing intellectual interests as well as external factors forced upon him after the Bolshevik Revolution in 1917. His seminal paper in Economics, and some argue his last paper in Economics rather than probability theory, was published in 1915 (Sulla teoria del bilancio del consumatore). Paul Samuelson noted that until 1936, he had been entirely unaware of Slutsky's 1915 "masterpiece" due to World War I and the paper's Italian language publication. R. G. D. Allen did the most to propagate Slutsky's work on consumer theory in published papers in 1936 and 1950.

Vincent Barnett argues:

"A good case can be made for the notion that Slutsky is the most famous of all Russian economists, even more well-known [than] N. D. Kondratiev, L. V. Kantorovich, or Mikhail Tugan-Baranovsky. There are eponymous concepts such as the Slutsky equation, the Slutsky diamond, the Slutsky matrix, and the Slutsky-Yule effect, and a journals-literature search conducted on his name for the years 1980-1995 yielded seventy-nine articles directly using some aspect of Slutsky’s work... Moreover, many microeconomics textbooks contain prominent mention of Slutsky’s contribution to the theory of consumer behavior, most notably the Slutsky equation, christened by John Hicks as the ‘Fundamental Equation of Value Theory'. Slutsky’s work is thus an integral part of contemporary mainstream economics and econometrics, a claim that cannot really be made by any other Soviet economist, perhaps even by any other Russian economist."

=== The Slutsky Effect ===
In the 1920s, Slutsky turned to working on probability theory and stochastic processes, but in 1927 he published his second famous article on economic theory, 'The Summation of Random Causes as a Source of Cyclical Processes'. This showed that it was possible for apparently cyclic behaviour to emerge as the result of random shocks to the economy if the latter were modelled using a stable stochastic difference equation with certain technical properties. This opened up a new approach to business cycle theory by hypothesising that the interaction of chance events could generate periodicity when none existed initially.

== Mathematical statistics work ==
Slutsky's later work was principally in probability theory and the theory of stochastic processes. He is generally credited for the result known as Slutsky's theorem. In 1928 he was an Invited Speaker of the ICM in Bologna.
