= Local nonsatiation =

Consumer preferences property

Illustration of preferences that are locally nonsatiated but not strongly monotonic. x_{1} and x_{2} are two goods and the blue line indicates an indifference curve.

In microeconomics, the property of local nonsatiation (LNS) of consumer preferences states that for any bundle of goods there is always another bundle of goods arbitrarily close that is strictly preferred to it.

Formally, if X is the consumption set, then for any $x \in X$ and every $\varepsilon>0$, there exists a $y \in X$ such that $\| y-x \| \leq \varepsilon$ and $y$ is strictly preferred to $x$.

Several things to note are:

1. Local nonsatiation is implied by monotonicity of preferences. However, as the converse is not true, local nonsatiation is a weaker condition.
2. There is no requirement that the preferred bundle y contain more of any good – hence, some goods can be "bads" and preferences can be non-monotone.
3. It rules out the extreme case where all goods are "bads", since the point x = 0 would then be a bliss point.
4. Local nonsatiation can only occur either if the consumption set is unbounded or open (in other words, it is not compact) or if x is on a section of a bounded consumption set sufficiently far away from the ends. Near the ends of a bounded set, there would necessarily be a bliss point where local nonsatiation does not hold.

== Applications of local nonsatiation ==
Local nonsatiation (LNS) is often applied in consumer theory, a branch of microeconomics, as an important property often assumed in theorems and propositions. Consumer theory is a study of how individuals make decisions and spend their money based on their preferences and budget. Local nonsatiation is also a key assumption for the First welfare theorem.

=== Indifference curve ===
An indifference curve is a set of all commodity bundles providing consumers with the same level of utility. The indifference curve is named so because the consumer would be indifferent between choosing any of these bundles. The indifference curves are not thick because of LNS.

=== Walras’s law ===
Local nonsatiation is a key assumption in the Walras’ law theorem. Walras's law says that if consumers have locally nonsatiated preferences, they will consume their entire budget over their lifetime.

=== The indirect utility function ===
The indirect utility function is a function of commodity prices and the consumer's income or budget. Indirect utility function v(p, w) where p is a vector of commodity prices, and w is an amount of income. Important assumption is that consumers have locally nonsatiated preferences. Related to the indirect utility function are utility maximization problem (UMP) and expenditure minimization problem (EMP). The UMP considers a consumer who wants to gain the maximum utility given wealth w. The EMP considers a consumer who wants to find a cheapest way to reach a certain level of utility. In both EMP and UMP consumers are assumed to have locally nonsatiated preferences.

=== Slutsky equation ===
The Slutsky equation describes the relationship between the Hicksian and Marshallian demands. Also shows the response of Marshallian demand to price changes. Preferences are supposed to be locally nonsatiated.

=== Competitive equilibrium ===
Market is at competitive equilibrium if there are no monopolies in the market. This means that prices are such that demand is equivalent to the supply for each good. Consumers trying to maximize their utility and producers trying to maximize their profit are satisfied with what they are getting. Competitive equilibrium may fail to exist if consumers are satiated, thus are assumed to be nonsatiated.

=== First welfare theorem ===
The first fundamental theorem of welfare economics states that any competitive equilibrium in a market, where consumers are locally nonsatiated is pareto optimal (pareto optimal is when no changes in economy can make one party better off without making another party worse off).
