= Marshallian demand function =

Microeconomic function

In microeconomics, a consumer's Marshallian demand function (named after Alfred Marshall) is the quantity they demand of a particular good as a function of its price, their income, and the prices of other goods, a more technical exposition of the standard demand function. It is a solution to the utility maximization problem of how the consumer can maximize their utility for given income and prices. A synonymous term is uncompensated demand function, because when the price rises the consumer is not compensated with higher nominal income for the fall in their real income, unlike in the Hicksian demand function. Thus the change in quantity demanded is a combination of a substitution effect and a wealth effect. Although Marshallian demand is in the context of partial equilibrium theory, it is sometimes called Walrasian demand as used in general equilibrium theory (named after Léon Walras).

According to the utility maximization problem, there are $L$ commodities with price vector $p$ and choosable quantity vector $x$. The consumer has income $I$, and hence a budget set of affordable packages

$$B(p, I) = \{x : p \cdot x \leq I\},$$

where $p \cdot x = \sum_i^L p_i x_i$ is the dot product of the price and quantity vectors. The consumer has a utility function

$$u : \mathbb R^L_+ \rightarrow \mathbb R.$$

The consumer's Marshallian demand correspondence is defined to be

$$x^*(p, I) = \operatorname{argmax}_{x \in B(p, I)} u(x)$$

== Revealed preference ==
Marshall's theory suggests that pursuit of utility is a motivational factor to a consumer which can be attained through the consumption of goods or service. The amount of consumer's utility is dependent on the level of consumption of a certain good, which is subject to the fundamental tendency of human nature and it is described as the law of diminishing marginal utility.

As utility maximum always exists, Marshallian demand correspondence must be nonempty at every value that corresponds with the standard budget set.

== Uniqueness ==
$x^*(p, I)$ is called a correspondence because in general it may be set-valued - there may be several different bundles that attain the same maximum utility. In some cases, there is a unique utility-maximizing bundle for each price and income situation; then, $x^*(p, I)$ is a function and it is called the Marshallian demand function.

If the consumer has strictly convex preferences and the prices of all goods are strictly positive, then there is a unique utility-maximizing bundle. To prove this, suppose, by contradiction, that there are two different bundles, $x_1$ and $x_2$, that maximize the utility. Then $x_1$ and $x_2$ are equally preferred. By definition of strict convexity, the mixed bundle $0.5 x_1 + 0.5 x_2$ is strictly better than $x_1 , x_2$. But this contradicts the optimality of $x_1 , x_2$.

== Continuity ==
The maximum theorem implies that if:

- The utility function $u(x)$ is continuous with respect to $x$,
- The correspondence $B(p, I)$ is non-empty, compact-valued, and continuous with respect to $p,I$,

then $x^*(p, I)$ is an upper-semicontinuous correspondence. Moreover, if $x^*(p, I)$ is unique, then it is a continuous function of $p$ and $I$.

Combining with the previous subsection, if the consumer has strictly convex preferences, then the Marshallian demand is unique and continuous. In contrast, if the preferences are not convex, then the Marshallian demand may be non-unique and non-continuous.

== Homogeneity ==
The optimal Marshallian demand correspondence of a continuous utility function is a homogeneous function with degree zero. This means that for every constant $a>0,$

$$x^*(a\cdot p, a\cdot I) = x^*(p, I).$$

This is intuitively clear. Suppose $p$ and $I$ are measured in dollars. When $a=100$, $ap$ and $aI$ are exactly the same quantities measured in cents. When prices and wealth go up by a factor a, the purchasing pattern of an economic agent remains constant. Obviously, expressing in different unit of measurement for prices and income should not affect the demand.

== Demand curve ==
Marshall's theory exploits that demand curve represents individual's diminishing marginal values of the good. The theory insists that the consumer's purchasing decision is dependent on the gainable utility of a goods or services compared to the price since the additional utility that the consumer gain must be at least as great as the price. The following suggestion proposes that the price demanded is equal to the maximum price that the consumer would pay for an extra unit of good or service. Hence, the utility is held constant along the demand curve. When the marginal utility of income is constant, or its value is the same across individuals within a market demand curve, generating net benefits of purchased units, or consumer surplus is possible through adding up of demand prices.

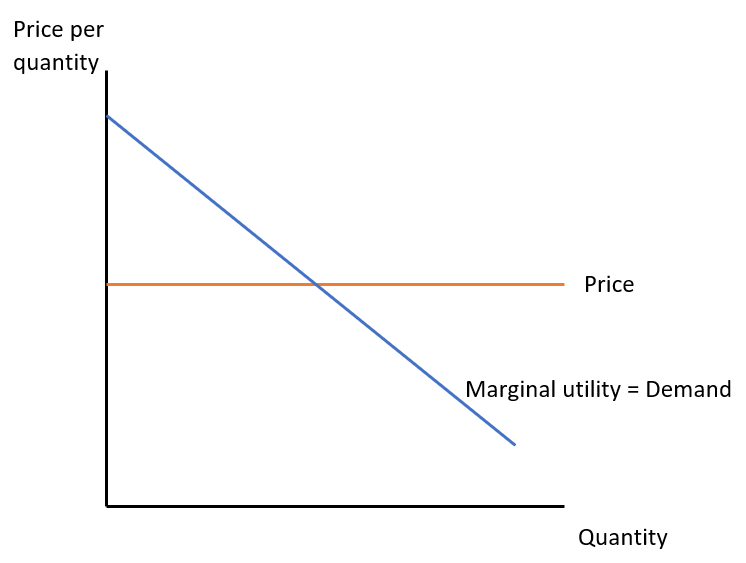
The intersection point of 'Price' and 'Marginal utility = Demand' shows the optimal level of individual's consumption.

== Examples ==
In the following examples, there are two commodities, 1 and 2.

1. The utility function has the Cobb–Douglas form:

$$u(x_1,x_2) = x_1^{\alpha}x_2^{\beta}.$$

The constrained optimization leads to the Marshallian demand function:

$$x^*(p_1,p_2,I) = \left(\frac{\alpha I}{(\alpha+\beta)p_1}, \frac{\beta I}{(\alpha+\beta)p_2}\right).$$

2. The utility function is a CES utility function:

$$u(x_1,x_2) = \left[ \frac{x_1^{\delta}}{\delta} + \frac{x_2^{\delta}}{\delta} \right]^{\frac{1}{\delta}}.$$

Then $x^*(p_1,p_2,I) = \left(\frac{I p_1^{\epsilon-1}}{p_1^{\epsilon} + p_2^{\epsilon}}, \frac{I p_2^{\epsilon-1}}{p_1^{\epsilon} + p_2^{\epsilon}}\right), \quad \text{with} \quad \epsilon = \frac{\delta}{\delta-1}.$

In both cases, the preferences are strictly convex, the demand is unique and the demand function is continuous.

3. The utility function has the linear form:

$$u(x_1,x_2) = x_1 + x_2.$$

The utility function is only weakly convex, and indeed the demand is not unique: when $p_1=p_2$, the consumer may divide his income in arbitrary ratios between product types 1 and 2 and get the same utility.

4. The utility function exhibits a non-diminishing marginal rate of substitution:

$$u(x_1,x_2) = (x_1^{\alpha} + x_2^{\alpha}), \quad \text{with} \quad \alpha > 1.$$

The utility function is not convex, and indeed the demand is not continuous: when $p_1<p_2$, the consumer demands only product 1, and when $p_2<p_1$, the consumer demands only product 2 (when $p_1=p_2$ the demand correspondence contains two distinct bundles: either buy only product 1 or buy only product 2).

== See also ==
- Hicksian demand function
- Utility maximization problem
- Slutsky equation
- Hicks–Marshall laws of derived demand
