= Substitution effect =

Microeconomic effect due to a price change

In consumer theory, the substitution effect is the change in a consumer's chosen combination of goods attributable to a change in their relative prices, distinguished from the income effect, caused by the resulting change in purchasing power. A price change can therefore be decomposed into substitution and income effects. When the price of a good falls, the consumer's budget constraint changes and the movement to a new consumption bundle can be separated into these two components.

Graphically, the substitution effect is represented by a movement along the original indifference curve, while the income effect accounts for the subsequent movement to a different indifference curve. A related concept is the elasticity of substitution, for which John Hicks and Joan Robinson developed related definitions based on changes in the relative quantities and prices of factors of production.

== History ==
The English-speaking world was fully introduced to this idea in 1934 when "A Reconsideration of the Theory of Value" was published by John Hicks and R. G. D. Allen, building upon work by Pareto in the 1890s and coming to conclusions Eugen Slutsky's had realized in 1915.

== Graphical analysis ==

Suppose the initial situation is given by the graph (with good Y plotted horizontally) with the indicated (and never-changing) indifference curves shown and with budget constraint BC1 and with the consumer choosing point A because it puts him on the highest possible indifference curve consistent with BC1. The position and slope of the budget constraint are based on the consumer's income and on the prices of the two goods X and Y. If the price of Y falls, the budget constraint pivots to BC2, with a greater intercept of good Y because if all income were spent on Y more of it could be purchased at the now-lower price. The overall effect of the price change is that the consumer now chooses the consumption bundle at point C.

But the move from A to C can be decomposed into two parts. The substitution effect is the change that would occur if the consumer were required to remain on the original indifference curve; this is the move from A to B. The income effect is the simultaneous move from B to C that occurs because the lower price of one good in fact allows movement to a higher indifference curve. (In this graph Y is an inferior good since C is to the left of B so Y_{2} < Y_{s}.)

== Elasticity of substitution ==
The concept of the elasticity of substitution was developed by two different economists, each with their own focus. John Hicks defined elasticity of substitution—also known as the direct elasticity of substitution—as the percent change in the relative number of factors of production used given a particular percent change in relative prices or marginal products. Joan Robinson defined elasticity of substitution as the change in the ratio of the number of factors used divided by the change in the ratio of each factor's prices. These two definitions function in the same way when limited to two factors of production.

== See also ==
- Slutsky equation
- Consumer theory#Income effect
- Income–consumption curve
