= Indirect utility function =

Economic function

In economics, a consumer's indirect utility function $v(p, w)$ gives the consumer's maximal attainable utility when faced with a vector $p$ of goods prices and an amount of income $w$. It reflects both the consumer's preferences and market conditions.

This function is called indirect because consumers usually think about their preferences in terms of what they consume rather than prices. A consumer's indirect utility $v(p, w)$ can be computed from their utility function $u(x),$ defined over vectors $x$ of quantities of consumable goods, by first computing the most preferred affordable bundle, represented by the vector $x(p, w)$ by solving the utility maximization problem, and second, computing the utility $u(x(p, w))$ the consumer derives from that bundle. The resulting indirect utility function is

$$v(p,w)=u(x(p,w)).$$

The indirect utility function is:

- Continuous on R^{n}_{+} × R_{+} where n is the number of goods;
- Decreasing in prices;
- Strictly increasing in income;
- Homogenous with degree zero in prices and income; if prices and income are all multiplied by a given constant the same bundle of consumption represents a maximum, so optimal utility does not change;
- quasi-convex in (p,w).

Moreover, Roy's identity states that if v(p,w) is differentiable at $(p^0, w^0)$ and $\frac{\partial v(p,w)}{\partial w} \neq 0$, then

$$-\frac{\partial v(p^0,w^0)/\partial p_i}{\partial v(p^0,w^0)/\partial w}=x_i (p^0,w^0),\quad
i=1, \dots, n.$$

== Indirect utility and expenditure ==
The indirect utility function is the inverse of the expenditure function when the prices are kept constant. I.e, for every price vector $p$ and utility level $u$:

$$v(p, e(p,u)) \equiv u$$

== Example ==
Let's say the utility function is the Cobb-Douglas function $u(x_1, x_2) = x_1^{0.6}x_2^{0.4},$ which has the Marshallian demand functions

$$x_1(p_1, p_2) = \frac{ 0.6w}{p_1} \;\;\;\; {\rm and}\;\;\; x_2(p_1, p_2) = \frac{ 0.4w}{p_2},$$

where $w$ is the consumer's income. The indirect utility function $v(p_1, p_2, w)$ is found by replacing the quantities in the utility function with the demand functions thus:

$$v(p_1, p_2, w)  =   u(x_1^*, x_2^*) = (x_1^*)^{0.6}(x_2^*)^{0.4}  =  \left( \frac{ 0.6w}{p_1}\right)^{0.6}  \left( \frac{ 0.4w}{p_2}\right)^{0.4}  = (0.6^{0.6}*.4^{.4})w^{0.6+0.4}p_1^{-0.6}  p_2^{-0.4}  = K   p_1^{-0.6}  p_2^{-0.4}w,$$

where $K = (0.6^{0.6} * 0.4^{0.4}).$ Note that the utility function shows the utility for whatever quantities its arguments hold, even if they are not optimal for the consumer and do not solve his utility maximization problem. The indirect utility function, in contrast, assumes that the consumer has derived his demand functions optimally for given prices and income.

== See also ==
- Gorman polar form
- Hicksian demand function
- Value function
