= Outline of industrial organization =

Overview of and topical guide to industrial organization

The following outline is provided as an overview of and topical guide to industrial organization:

Industrial organization – describes the behavior of firms in the marketplace with regard to production, pricing, employment and other decisions. Issues underlying these decisions range from classical issues such as opportunity cost to neoclassical concepts such as factors of production.

== Overview ==
- a field of economics that studies:
  - the strategic behavior of firms
  - the structure of markets
    - Perfect competition
    - Monopolistic competition
    - Oligopoly
    - Oligopsony
    - Monopoly
    - Monopsony
  - and the interactions between them

== Concepts ==
Production side of Industry:

- Production theory
  - productive efficiency
  - factors of production
  - total, average, and marginal product curves
  - marginal productivity
  - isoquants & isocosts
  - the marginal rate of technical substitution
- Production function
  - inputs
  - diminishing returns to inputs
  - the stages of production
  - shifts in a production function
- Economic rent
  - classical factor rents
  - Paretian factor rents
- Production possibility frontier
  - what production levels are possible given a set of resources
  - the trade-off between various input combinations
  - the marginal rate of transformation

Cost side of Industry:

- Cost theory
  - Different types of costs
    - opportunity cost
    - accounting cost or historical costs
    - transaction cost
    - sunk cost
    - marginal cost
  - The isocost line
- Cost-of-production theory of value
- Long-run cost and production functions
  - long-run average cost
  - long-run production function and efficiency
  - returns to scale and isoclines
  - minimum efficient scale
  - plant capacity
- Economies of density
  - Economies of scale
    - the efficiency consequences of increasing or decreasing the level of production.
  - Economies of scope
    - the efficiency consequences of increasing or decreasing the number of different types of products produced, promoted, and distributed.
  - Network effect
    - the effect that one user of a good or service has on the value of that product to other people.
- Optimum factor allocation
  - output elasticity of factor costs
  - marginal revenue product
  - marginal resource cost
- Pricing and various aspects of the pricing decision
  - Transfer pricing
    - selling within a multi-divisional company
  - Joint product pricing
    - price setting when two products are linked
  - Price discrimination
    - different prices to different buyers
    - types of price discrimination
  - Yield management
  - Price skimming
    - price discrimination over time
  - Two-part tariffs
    - charging a price composed of two parts, usually an initial fee and an ongoing fee
  - Price points
    - the effects of a non-linear demand curve on pricing
  - Cost-plus pricing
    - a markup is applied to a cost term in order to calculate price
    - cost-plus pricing with elasticity considerations
    - cost plus pricing is often used along with break even analysis
  - Rate of return pricing
    - calculate price based on the required rate of return on investment, or rate of return on sales
- Profit maximization
  - determining the optimum price and quantity
  - the totals approach
  - marginal approach of production

== People ==
- Antoine Augustin Cournot
- Heinrich Freiherr von Stackelberg
- Jean Tirole
- Joseph Bertrand
- William Baumol

== See also ==
- Cost-of-production theory of value
- Factors of production
- Publications on production theory
- Microeconomics
- Outline of management
- Outline of organizational theory
- Outline of production
- Output (economics)
- Price
- Prices of production
- Pricing strategies
- Production (economics)
