= Price-consumption curve =

Economic concept

A Price-consumption curve.

In economics, a price-consumption curve represents how consumers' consumption bundles change as the price of one good changes while holding income, preferences, and the price of the other good constant. Price-consumption curves are constructed by taking the intersection points between a series of indifference curves and their corresponding budget lines as the price of one of the two goods changes. Price-consumption curves are used to connect concepts of utility, indifference curves, and budget lines to supply-demand models. At each price there is a single corresponding quantity of either good. Due to this, by modeling the good with the changing price as any particular good and the good with the unchanging price as all other goods, the price-consumption curve can be used to construct an individual's demand curve for any particular good. Similar (In fact, the same) models can be used to determine how firms in an economy determine the least-cost combination of factors of production to use when producing goods. When Price-consumption curves are used in this context, they are called price-factor curves and are constructed with Isoquant curves and a line representing the ratio between factor prices instead of indifference curves and a budget line.
