= Elasticity of substitution =

Economic metric

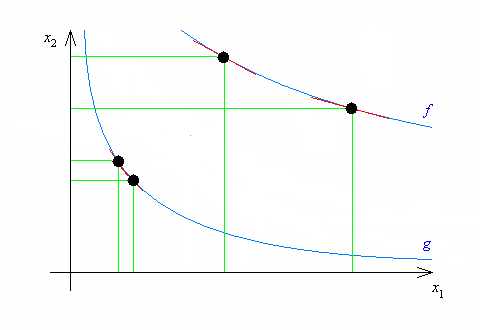
Isoquants/indifference curves with different elasticities of substitutions

Elasticity of substitution is the ratio of percentage change in capital-labour ratio with the percentage change in Marginal Rate of Technical Substitution. In a competitive market, it measures the percentage change in the two inputs used in response to a percentage change in their prices. It gives a measure of the curvature of an isoquant, and thus, the substitutability between inputs (or goods), i.e. how easy it is to substitute one input (or good) for the other.

== History of the concept ==
John Hicks introduced the concept in 1932. Joan Robinson independently discovered it in 1933 using a mathematical formulation that was equivalent to Hicks's, though that was not implemented at the time.

== Definition ==
The elasticity of substitution is the change in the ratio of the use of two goods with respect to the ratio of their marginal values or prices. The most common application is to the ratio of capital (K) and labor (L) used with respect to the ratio of their marginal products $MP_K$ and $MP_L$ or of the rental price (r) and the wage (w). Another application is to the ratio of consumption goods 1 and 2 with respect to the ratio of their marginal utilities or their prices. We will start with the consumption application.

Let the utility over consumption be given by $U(c_1,c_2)$ and let $U_{c_i}= \partial U(c_1,c_2)/\partial {c_i}$. Then the elasticity of substitution is:

$$E_{21} =\frac{d \ln (c_2/c_1) }{d \ln (MRS_{12})}
=\frac{d \ln (c_2/c_1) }{d \ln (U_{c_1}/U_{c_2})}
=\frac{\frac{d (c_2/c_1) }{c_2/c_1}}{\frac{d (U_{c_1}/U_{c_2})}{U_{c_1}/U_{c_2}}}
=\frac{\frac{d (c_2/c_1) }{c_2/c_1}}{\frac{d (p_1/p_2)}{p_1/p_2}}$$

where $MRS$ is the marginal rate of substitution. (These differentials are taken along the isoquant that passes through the base point. That is, the inputs $c_1$ and $c_2$ are not varied independently, but instead one input is varied freely while the other input is constrained to lie on the isoquant that passes through the base point. Because of this constraint, the MRS and the ratio of inputs are one-to-one functions of each other under suitable convexity assumptions.) The last equality presents $MRS_{12} = p_1/p_2$, where $p_1, p_2$ are the prices of goods 1 and 2. This is a relationship from the first order condition for a consumer utility maximization problem in Arrow–Debreu interior equilibrium, where the marginal utilities of two goods are proportional to prices. Intuitively we are looking at how a consumer's choices over consumption items change as their relative prices change.

Note also that $E_{21} = E_{12}$:

$$E_{21} =\frac{d \ln (c_2/c_1) }{d \ln (U_{c_1}/U_{c_2})}
=\frac{d \left(-\ln (c_2/c_1)\right) }{d \left(-\ln (U_{c_1}/U_{c_2})\right)}
=\frac{d \ln (c_1/c_2) }{d \ln (U_{c_2}/U_{c_1})}
= E_{12}$$

An equivalent characterization of the elasticity of substitution is:

$$E_{21} =\frac{d \ln (c_2/c_1) }{d \ln (MRS_{12})}
=-\frac{d \ln (c_2/c_1) }{d \ln (MRS_{21})}
=-\frac{d \ln (c_2/c_1) }{d \ln (U_{c_2}/U_{c_1})}
=-\frac{\frac{d (c_2/c_1) }{c_2/c_1}}{\frac{d (U_{c_2}/U_{c_1})}{U_{c_2}/U_{c_1}}}
=-\frac{\frac{d (c_2/c_1) }{c_2/c_1}}{\frac{d (p_2/p_1)}{p_2/p_1}}$$

In discrete-time models, the elasticity of substitution of consumption in periods $t$ and $t+1$ is known as elasticity of intertemporal substitution.

Similarly, if the production function is $f(x_1,x_2)$ then the elasticity of substitution is:

$$\sigma_{21} =\frac{d \ln (x_2/x_1) }{d \ln MRTS_{12}}
=\frac{d \ln (x_2/x_1) }{d \ln (\frac{df}{dx_1}/\frac{df}{dx_2})}
=\frac{\frac{d (x_2/x_1) }{x_2/x_1}}{\frac{d (\frac{df}{dx_1}/\frac{df}{dx_2})}{\frac{df}{dx_1}/\frac{df}{dx_2}}}
=-\frac{\frac{d (x_2/x_1) }{x_2/x_1}}{\frac{d (\frac{df}{dx_2}/\frac{df}{dx_1})}{\frac{df}{dx_2}/\frac{df}{dx_1}}}$$

where $MRTS$ is the marginal rate of technical substitution.

The inverse of elasticity of substitution is elasticity of complementarity.

== Example ==
Consider Cobb–Douglas production function $f(x_1,x_2)=x_1^a x_2^{1-a}$.

The marginal rate of technical substitution is

$$MRTS_{21} = \frac{1-a}{a} \frac{x_1}{x_2}$$

It is convenient to change the notations. Denote

$$\frac{1-a}{a} \frac{x_1}{x_2}=\theta$$

Rewriting this we have

$$\frac{x_1}{x_2} = \frac{a}{1-a}\theta$$

Then the elasticity of substitution is

$$\sigma_{21}  = \frac{d \ln (\frac{x_1}{x_2})}{d \ln (MRTS_{21})} = \frac{d \ln (\frac{x_1}{x_2})}{d \ln (\theta)} = \frac{d \frac{x_1}{x_2}}{\frac{x_1}{x_2}} \frac{\theta}{d \theta} = \frac{d \frac{x_1}{x_2}}{d \theta} \frac{\theta}{\frac{x_1}{x_2}} = \frac{a}{1-a} \frac{1-a}{a} \frac{x_1}{x_2} \frac{x_2}{x_1} = 1$$

== Economic interpretation ==
Given an original allocation/combination and a specific substitution on allocation/combination for the original one, the larger the magnitude of the elasticity of substitution (the marginal rate of substitution elasticity of the relative allocation) means the more likely to substitute. There are always two sides to the market; here we are talking about the receiver, since the elasticity of preference is that of the receiver.

The elasticity of substitution also governs how the relative expenditure on goods or factor inputs changes as relative prices change. Let $S_{21}$ denote expenditure on $c_2$ relative to that on $c_1$. That is:

$$S_{21} \equiv \frac{p_2 c_2}{p_1 c_1}$$

As the relative price $p_2/p_1$ changes, relative expenditure changes according to:

$$\frac{dS_{21}}{d\left(p_2/p_1\right)} = \frac{c_2}{c_1} + \frac{p_2}{p_1}\cdot\frac{d\left(c_2/c_1\right)}{d\left(p_2/p_1\right)}
= \frac{c_2}{c_1}\left[1 + \frac{d\left(c_2/c_1\right)}{d\left(p_2/p_1\right)}\cdot\frac{p_2/p_1}{c_2/c_1} \right]
= \frac{c_2}{c_1}\left(1 - E_{21} \right)$$

Thus, whether or not an increase in the relative price of $c_2$ leads to an increase or decrease in the relative expenditure on $c_2$ depends on whether the elasticity of substitution is less than or greater than one.

Intuitively, the direct effect of a rise in the relative price of $c_2$ is to increase expenditure on $c_2$, since a given quantity of $c_2$ is more costly. On the other hand, assuming the goods in question are not Giffen goods, a rise in the relative price of $c_2$ leads to a fall in relative demand for $c_2$, so that the quantity of $c_2$ purchased falls, which reduces expenditure on $c_2$.

Which of these effects dominates depends on the magnitude of the elasticity of substitution. When the elasticity of substitution is less than one, the first effect dominates: relative demand for $c_2$ falls, but by proportionally less than the rise in its relative price, so that relative expenditure rises. In this case, the goods are gross complements.

Conversely, when the elasticity of substitution is greater than one, the second effect dominates: the reduction in relative quantity exceeds the increase in relative price, so that relative expenditure on $c_2$ falls. In this case, the goods are gross substitutes.

Note that when the elasticity of substitution is exactly one (as in the Cobb–Douglas case), expenditure on $c_2$ relative to $c_1$ is independent of the relative prices.

== Empirical estimates ==
Elasticities of substitution have been estimated for many pairs of inputs. In labor economics, the elasticity of substitution between skilled and unskilled labor is a central parameter in models of wage inequality; estimates by Katz and Murphy imply a value of about 1.4 for college-educated relative to high-school-educated workers in United States data for 1963–1987. A 2024 meta-analysis of 682 estimates from 77 studies found that publication bias exaggerates the reported inverse elasticities, implying a corrected mean elasticity of about 4, with a lower bound of 2 and smaller values for developing countries.

== See also ==
- Constant elasticity of substitution
- Marginal rate of technical substitution
