= Budget line =

Budget line may refer to:

- A line or item within a budget
- Budget constraint, a limit to consumer purchases
- Value brand, a lower-priced product
