= Satiation =

Satiation may refer to:

- Satiety, feeling "full" and satisfied after eating; the cessation of hunger
- Economic satiation, where increasing the amount of a good reduces the worth of each individual unit of it
- Predator satiation, an anti-predator adaptation involving high population densities of the prey
- Semantic satiation, where repetition of a word or phrase causes it to temporarily lose meaning
- Satiation therapy, a type of behavioral therapy

== See also ==
- Saturation (disambiguation)
- Snatiation
