= Corner solution =

Solution to a problem in economics

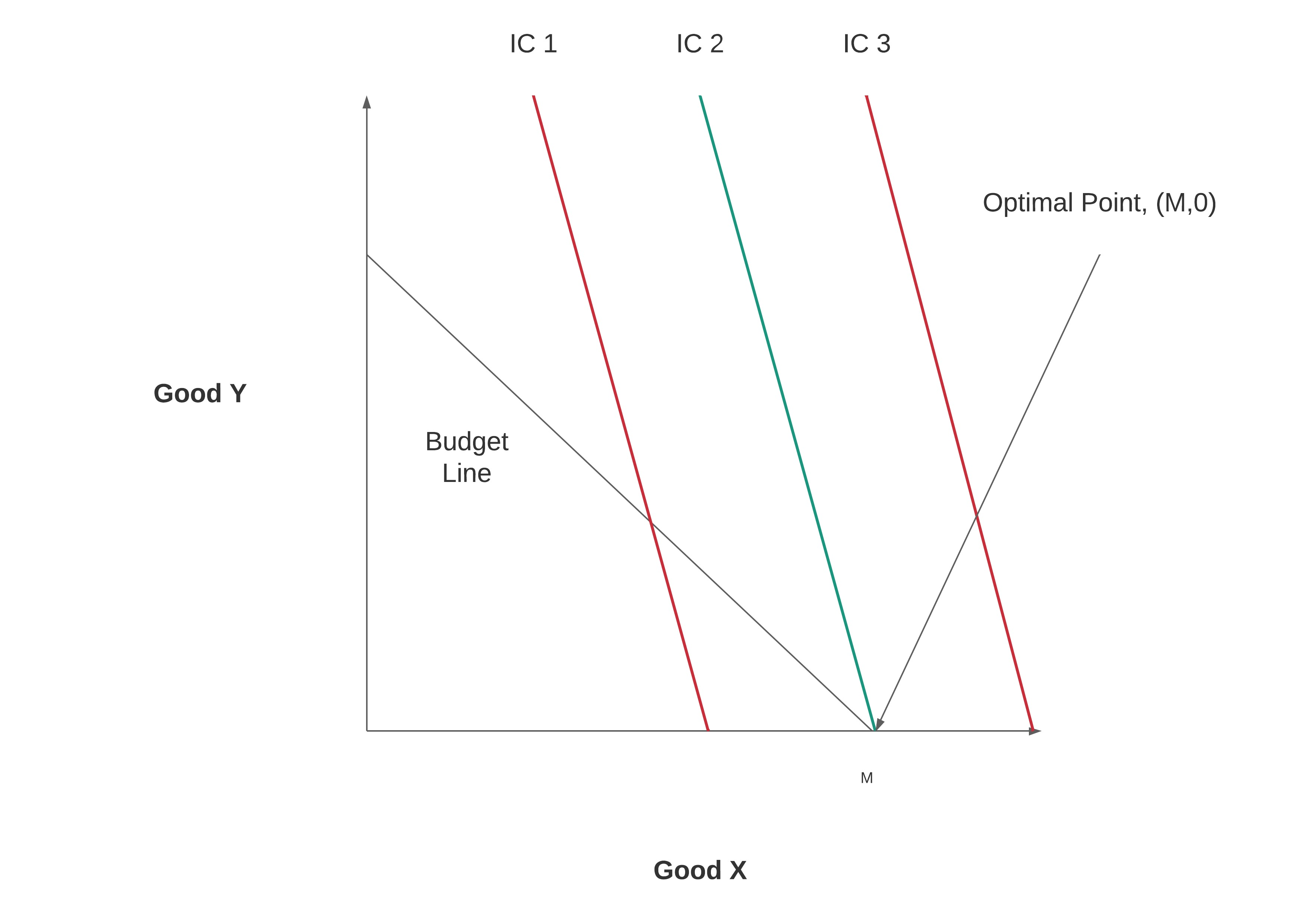
This diagram shows an example corner solution where the optimal bundle lies on the x-intercept at point (M,0). IC 1 is not a solution as it does not fully utilise the entire budget, IC 3 is unachievable as it exceeds the total amount of the budget. The optimal solution in this example is M units of good X and 0 units of good Y. This is a corner solution as the highest possible IC (IC 2) intersects the budget line at one of the intercepts (x-intercept).

In mathematics and economics, a corner solution is a special solution to an agent's maximization problem in which the quantity of one of the arguments in the maximized function is zero. In non-technical terms, a corner solution is when the chooser is either unwilling or unable to make a trade-off between goods.

== In economics ==
In the context of economics the corner solution is best characterised by when the highest indifference curve attainable is not tangential to the budget line, in this scenario the consumer puts their entire budget into purchasing as much of one of the goods as possible and none of any other. When the slope of the indifference curve is greater than the slope of the budget line, the consumer is willing to give up more of good 1 for a unit of good 2 than is required by the market. Thus, it follows that if the slope of the indifference curve is strictly greater than the slope of the budget line:

$\text{Slope of indifference curve} > \text{Slope of budget line}; \ \forall \text{ values of the slopes}$

Then the result will be a corner solution intersecting the x-axis. The converse is also true for a corner solution resulting from an intercept through the y-axis.

=== Examples ===
Real world examples of a corner solution occur when someone says "I wouldn't buy that at any price", "Why would I buy X when Y is cheaper" or "I will do X no matter the cost", this could be for any number of reasons e.g. a bad brand experience, loyalty to a specific brand or when a cheaper version of the same good exists.

Another example is "zero-tolerance" policies, such as a parent who is unwilling to expose their children to any risk, no matter how small and no matter what the benefits of the activity might be. "Nothing is more important than my child's safety" is a corner solution in its refusal to admit there might be trade-offs. The term "corner solution" is sometimes used by economists in a more colloquial fashion to refer to these sorts of situations.

Another situation a corner solution may arise is when the two goods in question are perfect substitutes. The word "corner" refers to the fact that if one graphs the maximization problem, the optimal point will occur at the "corner" created by the budget constraint and one axis.

== In mathematics ==
A corner solution is an instance where the "best" solution (i.e. maximizing profit, or utility, or whatever value is sought) is achieved based not on the market-efficient maximization of related quantities, but rather based on brute-force boundary conditions. Such a solution lacks mathematical elegance, and most examples are characterized by externally forced conditions (such as "variables x and y cannot be negative") that put the actual local extrema outside the permitted values.

Another technical way to state it is that a corner solution is a solution to a minimization or maximization problem where the non-corner solution is infeasible, that is, not in the domain. Instead, the solution is a corner solution on an axis where either x or y is equal to zero. For instance, from the example above in economics, if the maximal utility of two goods is achieved when the quantity of goods x and y are (−2, 5), and the utility is subject to the constraint x and y are greater than or equal to 0 (one cannot consume a negative quantity of goods) as is usually the case, then the actual solution to the problem would be a corner solution where x = 0.

== In consumer theory ==
The more usual solution will lie in the non-zero interior at the point of tangency between the objective function and the constraint. For example, in consumer theory the objective function is the indifference-curve map (the utility function) of the consumer. The budget line is the constraint. In the usual case, constrained utility is maximized on the budget constraint with strictly positive quantities consumed of both goods. For a corner solution, however, utility is maximized at a point on one axis where the budget constraint intersects the highest attainable indifference curve at zero consumption for one good with all income used for the other good. Furthermore, a range of lower prices for the good with initial zero consumption may leave quantity demanded unchanged at zero, rather than increasing it as in the more usual case.

== Calculation ==
To find a corner solution graphically one must shift the indifference curve in the direction which increases utility. If a tangency point is reached between the indifference curve and budget line then you do not have a corner solution, this is an interior solution. If you do not find a tangency point within the domain then the utility maximising indifference curve for the given budget constraint will be at an intersection between either the x or y axis (depending on whether the slope of the indifference curve is strictly greater than or less than the slope of the budget constraint) - this is a corner solution.

To solve a corner solution mathematically the Lagrangian method must be applied with the non-negativity constraints x ≥ 0 and y ≥ 0.

== See also ==
- Indifference curve: Assumptions section
- Interior solution (optimization)
