= Bliss point =

Bliss point may refer to:

- Bliss point (economics), a quantity of consumption where any further increase would make the consumer less satisfied
- Bliss point (food), the amount of an ingredient such as salt, sugar, or fat which optimizes palatability
