= Consumption–possibility frontier =

The CPF, or consumption–possibility frontier, is the budget constraint where participants in international trade can consume. Under autarky this constraint is identical to the production–possibility frontier.

== See also ==
- Utility–possibility frontier
