= Best available rate =

Hotel pricing mechanism

Best Available Rate (BAR), also known as Best Rate Guaranteed (BRG), is a pricing mechanism used by hotels and hotel chains. It was introduced as a result of the hotel industry mimicking the airline industry, which sets price by forecasting demand.

There are several interpretations and executions of BAR in the hotel industry. Sheryl E. Kimes defines BAR pricing is an "attempt to reduce confusion and to guarantee that the guest is quoted the lowest available rate for each night of a multiple-night stay." Galileo, a Global Distribution System provider, defines BAR as "a rate available to the general public that does not require pre-payment and does not impose cancellation or change penalties and/or fees, other than those imposed as a result of a hotel property's normal cancellation policy." However, some hotels include "fenced" rates as part of their BAR strategies.

== Rate Parity ==
The practise of hotels and their distributors agreeing to sell rooms at BAR rates is known as Rate Parity. Rate parity is widely employed in the hotel industry although in recent years its value has been questioned. In 2010, the United Kingdom's competition authority, then known as the Office of Fair Trading (OFT), opened a formal investigation into the practise of rate parity after it received a complaint by an Online Travel Agent (OTA), Skoosh. Since the OFT's investigation, numerous European states have challenged the legal status of rate parity (as a form of price fixing or resale price maintenance) including Switzerland, and France. In February 2014, a judge in a Texan court dismissed a rate parity class action suit.

In September 2014, an appeal tribunal overturned a proposal by Expedia, Booking.com, and IHG, to change their rate parity practices. The proposal had been accepted by the United Kingdom's competition authority, the Office of Fair Trading, but was overturned after an appeal by price comparison site, SkyScanner, and online travel agency, Skoosh.

In July 2015, the France became the first country in Europe to ban rate parity clauses in contracts, after the French National Assembly enacted the final vote of the ‘Law Macron’ and instructed the deletion of any rate parity clauses from contracts between hoteliers and Online Travel Agents. In Dec 2015, Germany's Bundeskartellamt court prohibited Booking.com from continuing to apply its BAR or 'best price' clauses and ordered the hotel booking portal to completely delete the clauses from its contracts and general terms and conditions as far as they affect hotels in Germany.

== Consumer views ==
Cornell University School of Hotel Administration carried out a study surveying the reactions of 153 travelers to BRG pricing. Respondents explained that being given the best available rate for every night of their stay was more fair than paying a single blended rate for a multiple-night stay.
