= Community indifference curve =

A community indifference curve is an illustration of different combinations of commodity quantities that would bring a whole community the same level of utility. The model can be used to describe any community, such as a town or an entire nation. In a community indifference curve, the indifference curves of all those individuals are aggregated and held at an equal and constant level of utility.

== History ==
Invented by Tibor Scitovsky, a Hungarian born economist, in 1941.

== Solving for a CIC ==
A community indifference curve (CIC) provides the set of all aggregate endowments $(\bar{x}, \bar{y}) = (x_1 + x_2, y_1, + y_2)$ needed to achieve a given distribution of utilities, $(\bar{u_1}, \bar{u_2})$. The community indifference curve can be found by solving for the following minimization problem:

$\min \bar{y} \text{ s.t. } U_1(x_1, y_1) \geq \bar{u_1} \text{ and } U_2(\bar{x}, \bar{y} - 1) \geq \bar{u_2}$

CICs assume allocative efficiency amongst members of the community. Allocative Efficiency provides that $MRS_1 xy = MRS_2 xy$. The CIC comes from solving for $\bar{y}$ in terms of $\bar{x}$, $y_{cic}(\bar{x})$.

Community indifference curves are an aggregate of individual indifference curves.

== See also ==
- Indifference curve
