= Conditional factor demands =

Cost-minimizing level of an input in economics

In economics, a conditional factor demand is the cost-minimizing level of an input (factor of production) like labor or capital, required to produce a given level of output, for given unit input costs (wage rate and cost of capital) of the input factors. A conditional factor demand function expresses the conditional factor demand as a function of the output level and the input costs. The conditional portion of this phrase refers to the fact that this function is conditional on a given level of output, so output is one argument of the function. This concept typically arises in a long run context in which both labor and capital usage are choosable by the firm, so a single optimization gives rise to conditional factor demands for each of labor and capital.

Since the optimal mix of input levels depends on the wage and rental rates, these rates are also arguments of the conditional demand functions for the inputs. This concept is similar to, but distinct from the factor demand functions, which give the optimal demands for the inputs when the level of output is free to be chosen. Since output is not fixed in that case, output is not an argument of those demand functions.

== Optimization problem ==
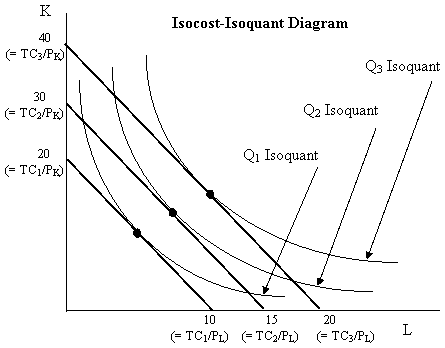
Isocost v. Isoquant Graph

In the simplest mathematical formulation of this problem, two inputs are used (often labor and capital), and the optimization problem seeks to minimize the total cost (amount spent on factors of production, say labor and physical capital) subject to achieving a given level of output, as illustrated in the graph. Each of the convex isoquants shows various combinations of labor and capital usage all of which would allow a given amount of output to be produced. Each straight line segment is an isocost curve showing various amounts of labor and capital whose combined usage would cost a given amount unique to that isocost curve. Conditional on producing the amount of output consistent with the middle isoquant, the lowest cost can be obtained by using amounts of labor and capital such that the point on the given isoquant is on the lowest possible isocost curve—at the point of tangency between the given isoquant and one of the cost curves. At the tangency, the marginal rate of technical substitution between the factors (the absolute value of the slope of the isoquant at the optimal point) equals the relative factor costs (the absolute value of the slope of the isocost curve).

This optimization can be formalized as follows:

$$\text{Minimize}\, wL + rK \, \, \text{with respect to}\,\, L \,\, \text{and} \,\, K,$$

subject to

$$f(L, K) = q,$$

where L and K are the chosen quantities of labor and capital, w and r are the fixed unit costs of labor (wage rate) and capital (rental rate) respectively, f is the production function specifying how much output can be produced with any combination of inputs, and q is the fixed level of output required.

The resulting factor demand functions are of the general form

$$L(w, r\,; q)$$

for labor demand, and

$$K(w, r\,; q).$$

for demand for physical capital. The wage rate and capital rental rates that affect the optimal input quantities can also be seen graphically because they both affect the slope of the isocost curves in the above graph, while the required quantity q of output affects them because it determines the relevant isoquant in the graph.

== Expansion path ==
As the target level of output is increased, the relevant isoquant becomes further and further out from the origin, and still it is optimal in a cost-minimization sense to operate at the tangency point of the relevant isoquant with an isocost curve. The set of all such tangency points is called the firm's expansion path.
