= Elasticity of complementarity =

Elasticity of complementarity (Hamermesh, 1993) is the percentage responsiveness of relative factor prices to a 1 percent change in relative inputs.

== Mathematical definition ==
Given the production function $f(x_1,x_2)$ then the elasticity of complementarity is defined as

$$c = \frac
{d \ln \left(\displaystyle \frac{df}{dx_1}/ \displaystyle\frac{df}{dx_2} \right)}
{d \ln (x_2/x_1) }
= \frac{\displaystyle \frac{d (\frac{df}{dx_1}/\frac{df}{dx_2})}{\frac{df}{dx_1}/\frac{df}{dx_2}}}
{\displaystyle \frac{d (x_2/x_1) }{x_2/x_1}}.$$

The inverse of elasticity of complementarity is elasticity of substitution.
