= Equipotential =

Region in space where every point is at the same potential

Computed electrostatic equipotentials (black contours) between two electrically charged spheres

In mathematics and physics, an equipotential or isopotential refers to a region in space where every point is at the same potential. This usually refers to a scalar potential (in that case it is a level set of the potential), although it can also be applied to vector potentials. An equipotential of a scalar potential function in n-dimensional space is typically an (n − 1)-dimensional space. The del operator illustrates the relationship between a vector field and its associated scalar potential field. An equipotential region might be referred as being 'of equipotential' or simply be called 'an equipotential'.

An equipotential region of a scalar potential in three-dimensional space is often an equipotential surface (or potential isosurface), but it can also be a three-dimensional mathematical solid in space. The gradient of the scalar potential (and hence also its opposite, as in the case of a vector field with an associated potential field) is everywhere perpendicular to the equipotential surface, and zero inside a three-dimensional equipotential region.

== Types ==
Electrical conductors offer an intuitive example. If a and b are any two points within or at the surface of a given conductor, and given there is no flow of charge being exchanged between the two points, then the potential difference is zero between the two points. Thus, an equipotential would contain both points a and b as they have the same potential. Extending this definition, an isopotential is the locus of all points that are of the same potential. In electrostatics and steady electric currents, the electric field (and hence the current, if any) is perpendicular to the equipotential surfaces of the electric potential (voltage). In electrostatics, a conductor is a three-dimensional equipotential region. In the case of a hollow conductor (Faraday cage), the equipotential region includes the space inside.

Gravity is perpendicular to the equipotential surfaces of the gravity potential. In gravity, a hollow sphere has a three-dimensional equipotential region inside, with no gravity from the sphere (see shell theorem). A ball will not be accelerated left or right by the force of gravity if it is resting on a flat, horizontal surface, because it is an equipotential surface. For the gravity of Earth (including its centrifugal potential owing to Earth's rotation), the corresponding geopotential isosurface (the equigeopotential) that best fits mean sea level is called the geoid.

== See also ==
- Contour line
- Isopotential map
- Potential flow
- Potential gradient
- Scalar potential
