= Isopotential map =

Representation of electrostatic potential in space

In electromagnetism, Isopotential maps are a measure of electrostatic potential in space. The spatial derivatives of an electrostatic field indicate the contours of the electrostatic field, so isopotential maps show where another charged molecule might interact, using equipotential lines (isopotentials).
