= Expansion path =

Concept in economics

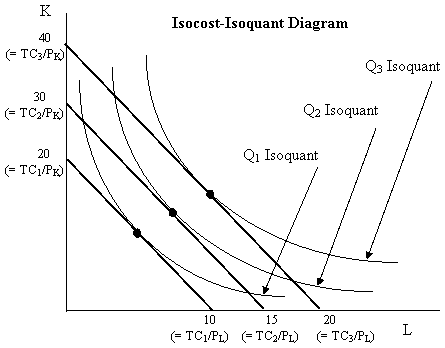
Isocost v. isoquant graph. Each line segment is an isocost line representing one particular level of total input costs, denoted TC, with P_{L} being the unit price of labor and P_{K} the unit price of physical capital. The convex curves are isoquants, each showing various combinations of input usages that would give the particular output level designated by the particular isoquant. Tangency points show the lowest cost input combination for producing any given level of output. A curve connecting the tangency points is called the expansion path because it shows how the input usages expand as the chosen level of output expands.

In economics, an expansion path (also called a scale line) is a path connecting optimal input combinations as the scale of production expands. It is often represented as a curve in a graph with quantities of two inputs, typically physical capital and labor, plotted on the axes. A producer seeking to produce a given number of units of a product in the cheapest possible way chooses the point on the expansion path that is also on the isoquant associated with that output level.

Economists Alfred Stonier and Douglas Hague defined “expansion path” as "that line which reflects the least–cost method of producing different levels of output, when factor prices remain constant." The points on an expansion path occur where the firm's isocost curves, each showing fixed total input cost, and its isoquants, each showing a particular level of output, are tangent; each tangency point determines the firm's conditional factor demands. As a producer's level of output increases, the firm moves from one of these tangency points to the next; the curve joining the tangency points is called the expansion path.

If an expansion path forms a straight line from the origin, the production technology is considered homothetic (or homoethetic). In this case, the ratio of input usages is always the same regardless of the level of output, and the inputs can be expanded proportionately so as to maintain this optimal ratio as the level of output expands. A Cobb–Douglas production function is an example of a production function that has an expansion path which is a straight line through the origin.

== See also ==
- Income-consumption curve, the closest analog in consumer theory
