= Air pollutant concentrations =

Air pollutant concentrations, as measured or as calculated by air pollution dispersion modeling, must often be converted or corrected to be expressed as required by the regulations issued by various governmental agencies. Regulations that define and limit the concentration of pollutants in the ambient air or in gaseous emissions to the ambient air are issued by various national and state (or provincial) environmental protection and occupational health and safety agencies.

Such regulations involve a number of different expressions of concentration. Some express the concentrations as ppmv (parts per million by volume) and some express the concentrations as mg/m^{3} (milligrams per cubic meter), while others require adjusting or correcting the concentrations to reference conditions of moisture content, oxygen content or carbon dioxide content. This article presents methods for converting concentrations from ppmv to mg/m^{3} (and vice versa) and for correcting the concentrations to the required reference conditions.

All of the concentrations and concentration corrections in this article apply only to air and other gases. They are not applicable for liquids.

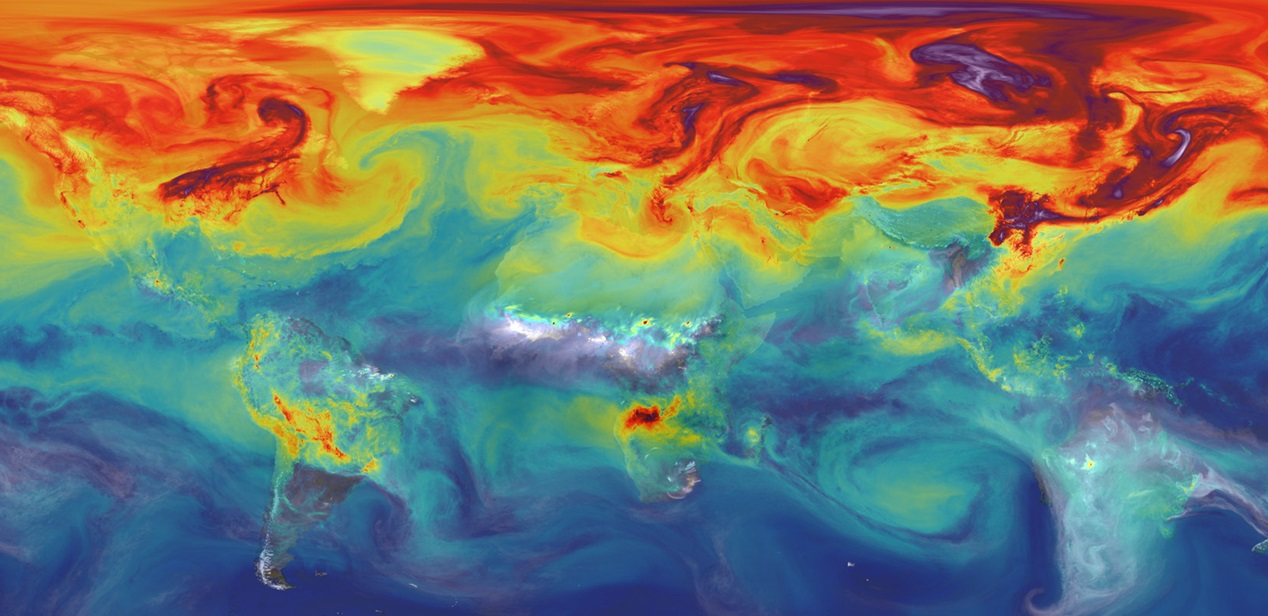
Carbon dioxide in Earth's atmosphere if half of global-warming emissions are not absorbed.
(NASA simulation; 9 November 2015)

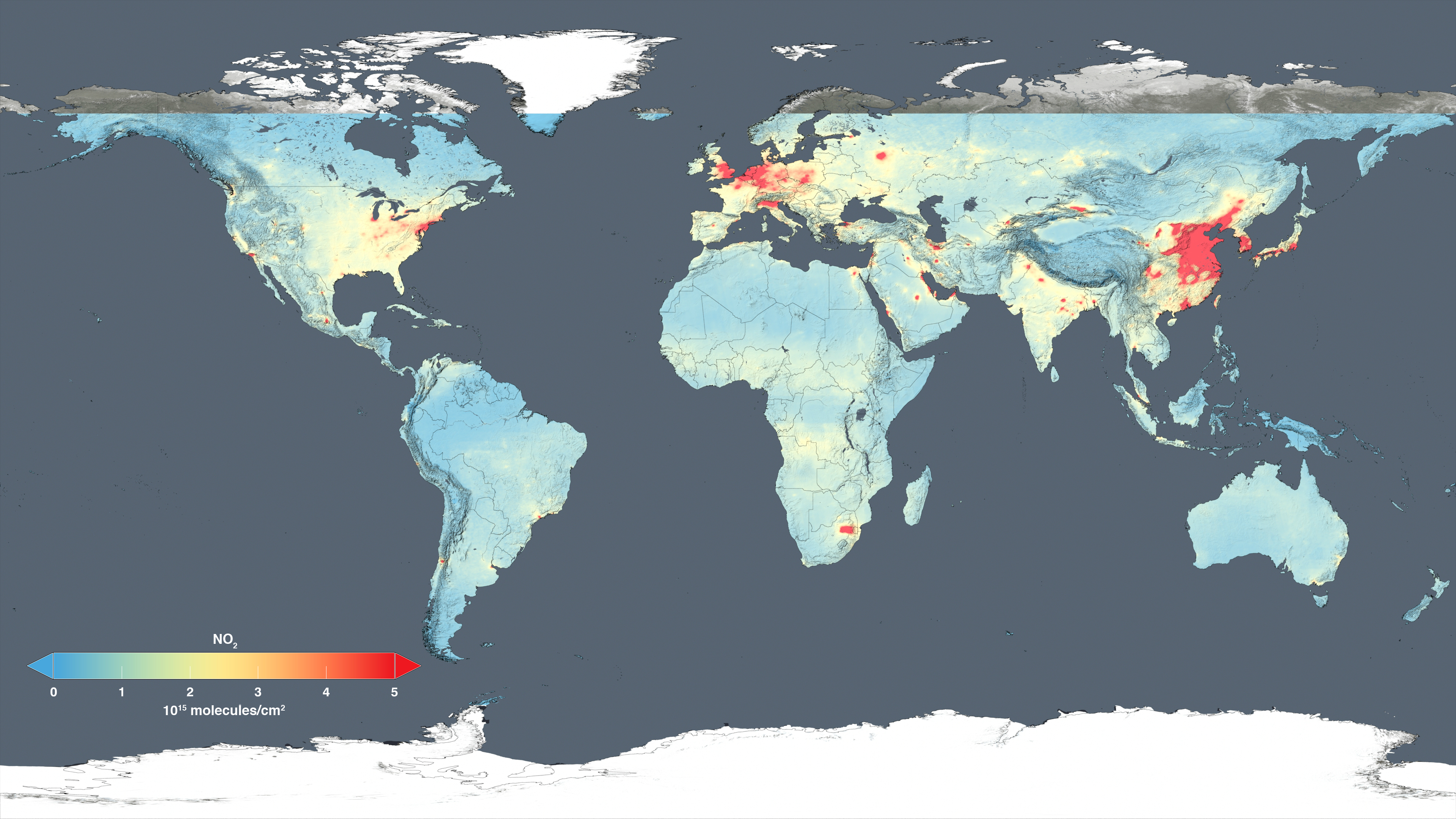
Nitrogen dioxide 2014 - global air quality levels
(released 14 December 2015).

== Converting air pollutant concentrations ==
The conversion equations depend on the temperature at which the conversion is wanted (usually about 20 to 25 °C). At an ambient sea level atmospheric pressure of 1 atm (101.325 kPa or 1.01325 bar), the general equation is:

$$\mathrm{ppmv} = \mathrm{mg}/\mathrm{m}^3\cdot \frac{(0.082057338\cdot T)}{M}$$

and for the reverse conversion:

$$\mathrm{mg}/\mathrm{m}^3 = \mathrm{ppmv}\cdot \frac{M}{(0.082057338\cdot T)}$$

where:	
mg/m^{3}	= milligrams of pollutant per cubic meter of air at sea level atmospheric pressure and T
ppmv	= air pollutant concentration, in parts per million by volume
T	= ambient temperature in K = 273. + °C
0.082057338	= Universal gas constant in L atm mol^{−1} K^{−1}
M	= molecular mass (or molecular weight) of the air pollutant

Notes:

- 1 atm = absolute pressure of 101.325 kPa or 1.01325 bar
- mol = gram mole and kmol = 1000 gram moles
- Pollution regulations in the United States typically reference their pollutant limits to an ambient temperature of 20 to 25 °C as noted above. In most other nations, the reference ambient temperature for pollutant limits may be 0 °C or other values.
- Although ppmv and mg/m^{3} have been used for the examples in all of the following sections, concentrations such as ppbv (i.e., parts per billion by volume), volume percent, mole percent and many others may also be used for gaseous pollutants.
- Particulate matter (PM) in the atmospheric air or in any other gas cannot be expressed in terms of ppmv, ppbv, volume percent or mole percent. PM is most usually (but not always) expressed as mg/m^{3} of air or other gas at a specified temperature and pressure.
- For gases, volume percent = mole percent
- 1 volume percent = 10,000 ppmv (i.e., parts per million by volume) with a million being defined as 10^{6}.
- Care must be taken with the concentrations expressed as ppbv to differentiate between the British billion which is 10^{12} and the USA billion which is 10^{9} (also referred to as the long scale and short scale billion, respectively).

== Correcting concentrations for altitude ==
Air pollutant concentrations expressed as mass per unit volume of atmospheric air (e.g., mg/m^{3}, μg/m^{3}, etc.) at sea level will decrease with increasing altitude. The concentration decrease is directly proportional to the pressure decrease with increasing altitude. Some governmental regulatory jurisdictions require industrial sources of air pollution to comply with sea level standards corrected for altitude. In other words, industrial air pollution sources located at altitudes well above sea level must comply with significantly more stringent air quality standards than sources located at sea level (since it is more difficult to comply with lower standards). For example, New Mexico's Department of the Environment has a regulation with such a requirement.

The change of atmospheric pressure with altitude (<20 km) can be obtained from this equation:

$$P_\mathrm h = P\,\cdot\bigg(\frac{288 - 6.5 h}{288}\bigg)^{5.2558}$$

Given an air pollutant concentration at sea-level atmospheric pressure, the concentration at higher altitudes can be obtained from this equation:

$$C_\mathrm h = C\,\cdot\bigg(\frac{288 - 6.5 h}{288}\bigg)^{5.2558}$$

where:
h	= altitude, in km
P	= atmospheric pressure at sea level
P_{h}	= atmospheric pressure at altitude h
C	= Air pollutant concentration, in mass per unit volume at sea level atmospheric pressure and specified temperature T
C_{h}	= Concentration, in mass per unit volume at altitude h and specified temperature T

As an example, given an air pollutant concentration of 260 mg/m^{3} at sea level, calculate the equivalent pollutant concentration at an altitude of 2800 meters:

C_{h} = 260 × [ { 288 - (6.5)(2.8) } / 288]^{5.2558} = 260 × 0.71 = 185 mg/m^{3}

Note:

- The above equation for the decrease of air pollution concentrations with increasing altitude is applicable only for about the first 10 km of altitude in the troposphere (the lowest atmospheric layer) and is estimated to have a maximum error of about 3 percent. However, 10 km of altitude is sufficient for most purposes involving air pollutant concentrations.

== Correcting concentrations for reference conditions ==
Many environmental protection agencies have issued regulations that limit the concentration of pollutants in gaseous emissions and define the reference conditions applicable to those concentration limits. For example, such a regulation might limit the concentration of NO_{x} to 55 ppmv in a dry combustion exhaust gas (at a specified reference temperature and pressure) corrected to 3 volume percent O_{2} in the dry gas. As another example, a regulation might limit the concentration of total particulate matter to 200 mg/m^{3} of an emitted gas (at a specified reference temperature and pressure) corrected to a dry basis and further corrected to 12 volume percent CO_{2} in the dry gas.

Environmental agencies in the USA often use the terms "dscf" or "scfd" to denote a "standard" cubic foot of dry gas. Likewise, they often use the terms "dscm" or "scmd" to denote a "standard" cubic meter of gas. Since there is no universally accepted set of "standard" temperature and pressure, such usage can be and is very confusing. It is strongly recommended that the reference temperature and pressure always be clearly specified when stating gas volumes or gas flow rates.

=== Correcting to a dry basis ===
If a gaseous emission sample is analyzed and found to contain water vapor and a pollutant concentration of say 40 ppmv, then 40 ppmv should be designated as the "wet basis" pollutant concentration. The following equation can be used to correct the measured "wet basis" concentration to a "dry basis" concentration:

$$C_\mathrm{dry\, basis} = \frac{C_\mathrm{wet\, basis}}{1 - w}$$

where:
C	= Concentration of the air pollutant in the emitted gas
w	= fraction of the emitted exhaust gas, by volume, which is water vapor

As an example, a wet basis concentration of 40 ppmv in a gas having 10 volume percent water vapor would have a:

C_{dry basis} = 40 ÷ ( 1 - 0.10 ) = 44.4 ppmv.

=== Correcting to a reference oxygen content ===
The following equation can be used to correct a measured pollutant concentration in a dry emitted gas with a measured O_{2} content to an equivalent pollutant concentration in a dry emitted gas with a specified reference amount of O_{2}:

$$C_\mathrm r = C_\mathrm m\cdot\frac{(20.9 - \mathrm{reference\,volume\, \%\, O_2})}{(20.9 - \mathrm {measured\,volume\, \%\, O_2})}$$

where:
C_{r}	= corrected concentration of a dry gas with a specified reference volume % O_{2}
C_{m}	= measured concentration in a dry gas having a measured volume % O_{2}

As an example, a measured NO_{x} concentration of 45 ppmv in a dry gas having 5 volume % O_{2} is:

45 × ( 20.9 - 3 ) ÷ ( 20.9 - 5 ) = 50.7 ppmv of NO_{x}

when corrected to a dry gas having a specified reference O_{2} content of 3 volume %.

Note:

- The measured gas concentration C_{m} must first be corrected to a dry basis before using the above equation.

=== Correcting to a reference carbon dioxide content ===
The following equation can be used to correct a measured pollutant concentration in an emitted gas (containing a measured CO_{2} content) to an equivalent pollutant concentration in an emitted gas containing a specified reference amount of CO_{2}:

$$C_\mathrm r = C_\mathrm m\cdot\frac {(\mathrm{reference\,volume\,\%\,CO_2})}{(\mathrm{measured\,volume\,\%\,CO_2})}$$

where:
C_{r}	= corrected concentration of a dry gas having a specified reference volume % CO_{2}
C_{m}	= measured concentration of a dry gas having a measured volume % CO_{2}

As an example, a measured particulates concentration of 200 mg/m^{3} in a dry gas that has a measured 8 volume % CO_{2} is:

200 × ( 12 ÷ 8 ) = 300 mg/m^{3}

when corrected to a dry gas having a specified reference CO_{2} content of 12 volume %.
