= Polygonizer =

Software to create a polygon mesh

In computer graphics, a polygonizer is a software component for converting a geometric model represented as an implicit surface to a polygon mesh.
