= Utility–possibility frontier =

Welfare economics concept

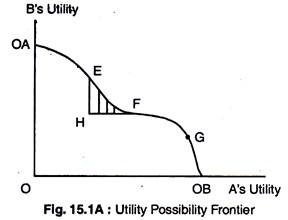
Utility Possibility Frontier

In welfare economics, a utility–possibility frontier (or utility possibilities curve), is a widely used concept analogous to the better-known production–possibility frontier. The graph shows the maximum amount of one person's utility given each level of utility attained by all others in society. The utility–possibility frontier (UPF) is the upper frontier of the utility possibilities set, which is the set of utility levels of agents possible for a given amount of output, and thus the utility levels possible in a given consumer Edgeworth box. The slope of the UPF is the trade-off of utilities between two individuals. The absolute value of the slope of the utility-possibility frontier showcases the utility gain of one individual at the expense of utility loss of another individual, through a marginal change in outputs. Therefore, it can be said that the frontier is the utility maximisation by consumers given an economies' endowment and technology. This means that points on the curve are, by definition, Pareto efficient, which are represented by E, F and G in the image to the right. Meanwhile the points that do not lie on this curve are not Pareto efficient, as shown by point H. The utility possibility frontier also represents a social optimum, as any point on the curve is a maximisation of the given social welfare function.

However, based on the extent of society’s preferences for an equal distribution of real income, a point off the curve may be preferred. All points on or below the utility–possibility frontier are attainable by society; all points above it are not attainable. The utility–possibility frontier is derived from the contract curve.

In a competitive economy, any allocation over the utility–possibility frontier is a Pareto optimum, as the UPF is a representation of the Pareto contract curve in a different dimension (utilities rather than goods). The UPF is the set of points which, for a given level of utility of person 1, utility of person 2 is maximized (subject to resource availability). Because all points along the UPF represent different real income distributions, all being Pareto efficient, it is difficult to determine which utility combination is preferable to society. Usually, the social welfare function, which incorporates the deservedness of the two individuals and states how society’s well-being relates to that of the two individuals, is required to maximize social welfare. It is assumed that the value of social welfare changes as the individual utility of any member of society changes. To maximize social welfare, a point on the UPF would be chosen that also falls on the highest indifference curve for society.

The shape of the utility possibility curve is often represented as being concave to the origin, as cardinal utility is often assumed. Cardinal utility implies that consumers can rank their preferences over goods (utility in this case).

== Constructing a utility-possibility frontier ==
To graphically construct a utility possibility-frontier, the utility levels of consumers are plotted for every Pareto efficient allocation. The frontier is traced from the varying levels of the allocation

The process to derive the slope of the Utility Possibility Frontier.

The two individuals have a utility function of

U_{A} (X, Y) and U_{B} (X, Y), where X and Y represent two goods.

At optimality,

MRS^{A}_{XY} = MRS^{B}_{XY}

As stated above, the slope of the Utility Possibility Frontier maps the effect of a marginal change in utility.

U^{A}' = U^{A}_{X} (-dX) + U^{B}_{Y} dY

U^{B}' = U^{B}_{X} dX + U^{B}_{Y} dY

Since, MRS^{N}_{XY} = U^{N}_{X} / U^{N}_{Y}

MRS^{A}_{XY} = U^{A}_{X} / U^{A}_{Y}

= (U^{A}' / U^{A}_{Y} - dY) / (-dX)

MRS^{B}_{XY} = U^{B}_{X} / U^{B}_{Y}

= (U^{B}' / U^{B}_{Y} - dY) / dX

Since, the MRS^{A} = MRS^{B} along the UPF At Optimality, along the UPF Thus, as the MRSs must be equal along the UPF, which implies, after some rearrangement, that:

U^{B}' / U^{A}' = - U^{B}_{Y}/U^{A}_{Y}

The slope, as seen above, is equivalent to the absolute value of the marginal utilities of y.
