= Isocost =

Graph in economics

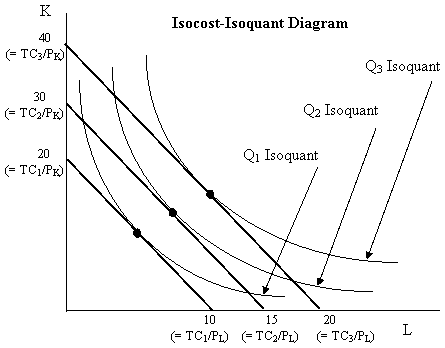
Isocost v. Isoquant Graph. Each line segment is an isocost line representing one particular level of total input costs, denoted TC in the graph and C in the article's text. P_{L} is the unit price of labor (w in the text) and P_{K} is the unit price of physical capital (r in the text).

In economics, an isocost line shows all combinations of inputs which cost the same total amount. Although similar to the budget constraint in consumer theory, the use of the isocost line pertains to cost-minimization in production, as opposed to utility-maximization. For the two production inputs labour and capital, with fixed unit costs of the inputs, the equation of the isocost line is

$$rK+wL = C\,$$

where w represents the wage rate of labour, r represents the rental rate of capital, K is the amount of capital used, L is the amount of labour used, and C is the total cost of acquiring those quantities of the two inputs.

The absolute value of the slope of the isocost line, with capital plotted vertically and labour plotted horizontally, equals the ratio of unit costs of labour and capital. The slope is:

$$-w/r. \,$$

The isocost line is combined with the isoquant map to determine the optimal production point at any given level of output. Specifically, the point of tangency between any isoquant and an isocost line gives the lowest-cost combination of inputs that can produce the level of output associated with that isoquant. Equivalently, it gives the maximum level of output that can be produced for a given total cost of inputs. A line joining tangency points of isoquants and isocosts (with input prices held constant) is called the expansion path.

== The cost-minimization problem ==
The cost-minimization problem of the firm is to choose an input bundle (K,L) feasible for the output level y that costs as little as possible. A cost-minimizing input bundle is a point on the isoquant for the given y that is on the lowest possible isocost line. Put differently, a cost-minimizing input bundle must satisfy two conditions:

1. it is on the y-isoquant
2. no other point on the y-isoquant is on a lower isocost line.

== The case of smooth isoquants convex to the origin ==
If the y-isoquant is smooth and convex to the origin and the cost-minimizing bundle involves a positive amount of each input, then at a cost-minimizing input bundle an isocost line is tangent to the y-isoquant. Now since the absolute value of the slope of the isocost line is the input cost ratio $w/r$, and the absolute value of the slope of an isoquant is the marginal rate of technical substitution (MRTS), we reach the following conclusion: If the isoquants are smooth and convex to the origin and the cost-minimizing input bundle involves a positive amount of each input, then this bundle satisfies the following two conditions:

- It is on the y-isoquant (i.e. F(K, L) = y where F is the production function), and
- the MRTS at (K, L) equals w/r.

The condition that the MRTS be equal to w/r can be given the following intuitive interpretation. We know that the MRTS is equal to the ratio of the marginal products of the two inputs. So the condition that the MRTS be equal to the input cost ratio is equivalent to the condition that the marginal product per dollar is equal for the two inputs. This condition makes sense: at a particular input combination, if an extra dollar spent on input 1 yields more output than an extra dollar spent on input 2, then more of input 1 should be used and less of input 2, and so that input combination cannot be optimal. Only if a dollar spent on each input is equally productive is the input bundle optimal.

An isocost line is a curve which shows various combinations of inputs that cost the same total amount . For the two production inputs labour and capital, with fixed unit costs of the inputs, the isocost curve is a straight line . The isocost line is always used to determine the optimal production combined with the isoquant line .

if w represents the wage rate of labour, r represents the rental rate of capital, K is the amount of capital used, L is the amount of labour used, and C is the total cost of the two inputs, than the isocost line can be

C=rK+wL

In the figure, the point C / w on the horizontal axis represents that all the given costs are used in labor, and the point C / r on the vertical axis represents that all the given costs are used in capital . The line connecting these two points is the isocost line.

The slope is -w/r which represents the relative price. Any point within the isocost line indicates that there are surplus after purchasing the combination of labor and capital at that point. Any point outside the isocost line indicates that the combination of labor and capital is not enough to be purchased at the given cost. Only the point in the isocost line shows the combination that can be purchased exactly at the given cost .

If the prices of the t factors change, the isocost line will also change . Suppose w rises, so that the maximum amount of labor that can be employed at the same cost will decrease, that is, the intercept of the isocost line on the L axis will decrease; and because r remains unchanged, the intercept of the isocost line on the K axis will remain unchanged.
