= Economic satiation =

The economic principle of satiation is the effect whereby the more of a good one possesses, the less one is willing to give up to get more of it. This effect is caused by diminishing marginal utility, the effect whereby the consumer gains less utility per unit of a product the more units consumed.

For example, if someone buys a piece of technology or signs up to a social media site, they may enjoy using it; if they then buy more items of technology or sign up to more social media sites, they may enjoy using those items less (and so forth). It can continue to the point where the consumption of an item or group of items becomes a negative experience.

== See also ==
- Bliss point
