= Income–consumption curve =

Function in economics

In economics and particularly in consumer choice theory, the income-consumption curve (also called income expansion path and income offer curve) is a curve in a graph in which the quantities of two goods are plotted on the two axes; the curve is the locus of points showing the consumption bundles chosen at each of various levels of income.

The income effect in economics can be defined as the change in consumption resulting from a change in real income. This income change can come from one of two sources: from external sources, or from income being freed up (or soaked up) by a decrease (or increase) in the price of a good that money is being spent on. The effect of the former type of change in available income is depicted by the income-consumption curve discussed in the remainder of this article, while the effect of the freeing-up of existing income by a price drop is discussed along with its companion effect, the substitution effect, in the article on the latter. For example, if a consumer spends one-half of their income on bread alone, a fifty-percent decrease in the price of bread will increase the free money available to him or her by the same amount which he or she can spend in buying more bread or something else

The consumer's preferences, monetary income and prices play an important role in solving the consumer's optimization problem (choosing how much of various goods to consume so as to maximize their utility subject to a budget constraint). The comparative statics of consumer behavior investigates the effects of changes in the exogenous or independent variables (especially prices and money incomes of the consumers) on the chosen values of the endogenous or dependent variables (the consumer's demands for the goods). When the income of the consumer rises with the prices held constant, the optimal bundle chosen by the consumer changes as the feasible set available to them changes. The income–consumption curve is the set of tangency points of indifference curves with the various budget constraint lines, with prices held constant, as income increases shifting the budget constraint out.

== Consumer theory ==
Figure 1: An increase in the income, with the prices of all goods fixed, causes consumers to alter their choice of market basket. The extreme left and right indifference curves belong to different individuals with different preferences, while the three central indifference curves belong to one individual for whom the income-consumption curve is shown. Each blue line represents one level of total consumption expenditure common to all its points; its slope depends on the two goods' relative prices.

The income effect is a phenomenon observed through changes in purchasing power. It reveals the change in quantity demanded brought by a change in real income. The figure 1 on the left shows the consumption patterns of the consumer of two goods X^{1} and X^{2}, the prices of which are p_{1} and p_{2} respectively. The initial bundle X^{*}, is the bundle which is chosen by the consumer on the budget line B_{1}. An increase in the money income of the consumer, with p_{1} and p_{2} constant, will shift the budget line outward parallel to itself.

In the figure, this means that the change in the money income of the consumer will shift the budget line B1 outward parallel to itself to B2 where the bundle X^{'} bundle will be chosen. Again, an increase in the money income of the consumer will push the budget line B2 outward parallel to itself to B3 where the bundle X^{"} will be the bundle which will be chosen. Thus, it can be said that, with variations in income of the consumers and with the prices held constant the income–consumption curve can be traced out as the set of optimal points.

== For different types of goods ==
In the case illustrated with the help of Figure 1 both X^{1} and X^{2} are normal goods in which case, the demand for the good increases as money income rises. However, if the consumer has different preferences, he has the option to choose X^{0} or X^{+} on budget line B2. As the income of the consumer rises, and the consumer chooses X^{0} instead of X^{'} i.e. if the consumer's indifference curve is I^{4} and not I^{2}, then the demand for X^{1} would fall . In that case, X^{1} would be called an inferior good i.e. demand for good X^{1} decreases with a rise in income of the consumer. Thus, a rise in income of the consumer may lead his demand for a good to rise, fall or not change at all. The knowledge of consumer preferences is essential to predict whether a particular good is inferior or normal.

=== Normal goods ===
Figure 2: Income-consumption curve for normal goods

In the figure 2 to the left, B1, B2 and B3 are the different budget lines and I^{1}, I^{2} and I^{3} are the indifference curves that are available to the consumer. As shown earlier, as the income of the consumer rises, the budget line moves outwards parallel to itself. In this case, from initial bundle X^{*}, with an increase in the income of the consumer the budget line moves from B1 to B2 and the consumer would choose X^{'} bundle and subsequently, with a further rise in consumer's income the budget line moves from B2 to B3 and the consumer would choose X^{"} bundle and so on. The consumer would thus maximize his utility at the points X^{*}, X^{'} and X^{"}, and by joining these points, the income-consumption curve can be obtained.

=== Inferior goods ===
Figure 3: with an increase of income, demand for normal good X^{2} rises while, demand for inferior good X^{1} falls.

The figure on the right (figure 3), shows the consumption patterns of the consumer of two goods X^{1} and X^{2}, the prices of which are p_{1} and p_{2} respectively, where B1 and B2 are the budget lines and I^{1} and I^{2} are the indifference curves. Figure 3 clearly shows that, with a rise in the income of the consumer, the initial budget line B1 moves outward parallel to itself to B2 and the consumer now chooses X^{'} bundle to the initial bundle X^{*}. The figure shows that, the demand for X^{2} has risen from X^{2}_{1} to X^{2}_{2} with an outward shift of the budget line from B1 to B2 (caused due to rise in the income of the consumer). This essentially means that, good X^{2} is a normal good as the demand for X^{2} rose with an increase in the income of the consumer.

In contrast, it is to be noted from the figure, that the demand for X^{1} has fallen from X^{1}_{1} to X^{1}_{2} with an outward shift of the budget line from B1 to B2 (caused due to rise in the income of the consumer). This implies that, good X^{1} is an inferior good as the demand for X^{1} fell with an increase in the income of the consumer.

The consumer maximizes his utility at points X^{*} and X^{'} and by joining these points, the income–consumption curve can be obtained. In figure 3, the income–consumption curve bends back on itself as with an increase income, the consumer demands more of X^{2} and less of X^{1}. The income–consumption curve in this case is negatively sloped and the income elasticity of demand will be negative. Also the price effect for X^{2} is positive, while it is negative for X^{1}.

$\Delta X_n^1$ is the change in the demand for good 1 when we change income from $m'$ to $m$, holding the price of good 1 fixed at $p_1$:

$\Delta X_n^1 = X^1(p_1, m) - X^1(p_1,m').$

== See also ==
- Consumer theory § Income effect
- Expansion path, the closest analog in production theory
- Income distribution
