= Bliss point (economics) =

In economics, the bliss point is a quantity of consumption where any further increase would make the consumer less satisfied. It is a quantity of consumption which maximizes utility in the absence of budget constraint. In other words, it refers to the amount of consumption that would be chosen by a person so rich that money imposed no constraint on their decisions.

== See also ==
- Economic satiation
- Keynes–Ramsey rule
