= Marginal rate of technical substitution =

Concept in microeconomic theory

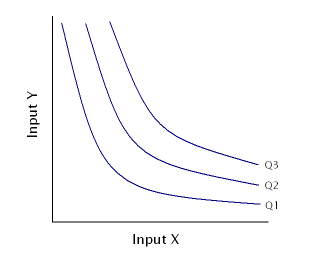
An isoquant map where Q3 > Q2 > Q1.At any point on any isoquant, the marginal rate of technical substitution is the absolute value of the slope of the isoquant at that point.

In microeconomic theory, the marginal rate of technical substitution (MRTS)—or technical rate of substitution (TRS)—is the amount by which the quantity of one input has to be reduced ($-\Delta x_2$) when one extra unit of another input is used ($\Delta x_1 = 1$), so that output remains constant ($y = \bar{y}$).

$MRTS(x_1,x_2) = \frac{-\Delta x_2}{\Delta x_1}$

It can be shown that $MRTS(x_1,x_2) = \frac{MP_1}{MP_2}$, where $MP_1$ and $MP_2$ are the marginal products of input 1 and input 2, respectively.

Proof

Let $Y$ be our production function.

By taking the total differential of the production function, we obtain the following results:

$\ dY=(\partial Y/\partial x_1) dx_1 + (\partial Y/\partial x_2)dx_2$, or substituting from above,
$\ dY= MP_1 dx_1 + MP_2 dx_2$, or, without loss of generality, the total derivative of the utility function with respect to good x,
$\frac{dY}{dx_1} = MP_1 \frac{dx_1}{dx_1} + MP_2 \frac{dx_2}{dx_1}$, that is,
$$\frac{dY}{dx_1} = MP_1 + MP_2 \frac{dx_2}{dx_1}$$.

Through any point on the indifference curve, $dY/dx_1 = 0$, because $Y=c$, where $c$ is a constant. It follows from the above equation that:

$0 = MP_1 + MP_2 \frac{dx_2}{dx_1}$, or rearranging
$$- MP_1 = MP_2 \frac{dx_2}{dx_1}$$
$$\frac{MP_1}{MP_2} = \frac{-dx_2}{dx_1}$$

Along an isoquant, the MRTS shows the rate at which one input (e.g. capital or labor) may be substituted for another, while maintaining the same level of output. Thus the MRTS is the absolute value of the slope of an isoquant at the point in question.

When relative input usages are optimal, the marginal rate of technical substitution is equal to the relative unit costs of the inputs, and the slope of the isoquant at the chosen point equals the slope of the isocost curve (see conditional factor demands). It is the rate at which one input is substituted for another to maintain the same level of output.

== See also ==
- Marginal rate of substitution (the same concept on consumption side)
- Marginal rate of transformation (slope of the production-possibility frontier)
