= Labor demand =

In economics, the labor demand of an employer is the number of labor-hours that the employer is willing to hire based on the various exogenous (externally determined) variables it is faced with, such as the wage rate, the unit cost of capital, the market-determined selling price of its output, etc. The function specifying the quantity of labor that would be demanded at any of various possible values of these exogenous variables is called the labor demand function. The sum of the labor-hours demanded by all employers in total is the market demand for labor.

== Perfect competitor ==
The long-run labor demand function of a competitive firm is determined by the following profit maximization problem:

$$\text{Maximize} \,\, pQ - wL - rK  \,\, \text{with respect to} \,\, Q, \, L, \, \text{and} \, K$$

$$\text{subject to}$$

$$Q = f\,(L, K),$$

where p is the exogenous selling price of the produced output, Q is the chosen quantity of output to be produced per month, w is the hourly wage rate paid to a worker, L is the number of labor hours hired (the quantity of labor demanded) per month, r is the cost of using a machine (capital) for an hour (the "rental rate"), K is the number of hours of machinery used (the quantity of capital demanded) per month, and f is the production function specifying the amount of output that can be produced using any of various combinations of quantities of labor and capital. This optimization problem involves simultaneously choosing the levels of labor, capital, and output. The resulting labor demand, capital demand, and output supply functions are of the general form

$$L(p, w, r),$$

$$K(p, w, r),$$

and

$$Q(p, w, r).$$

Ordinarily labor demand will be an increasing function of the product's selling price p (since a higher p makes it worthwhile to produce more output and to hire additional units of input in order to do so), and a decreasing function of w (since more expensive labor makes it worthwhile to hire less labor and produce less output). The rental rate of capital, r, has two conflicting effects: more expensive capital induces the firm to substitute away from physical capital usage and into more labor usage, contingent on any particular level of output; but the higher capital cost also induces the firm to produce less output, requiring less usage of both inputs. Depending on which effect predominates, labor demand could be either increasing or decreasing in r.

The short-run labor demand function is the result of the same optimization except that capital usage K is exogenously given by past physical investment rather than being a choice variable.

== Monopolist ==
If the firm is a monopolist, its long-run optimization problem is different because it cannot take its selling price as given: the more it produces, the lower will be the price it can obtain for each unit of output, according to the market demand curve for the product. So its profit-maximization problem is

$$\text{Maximize} \,\, pQ(p) - wL - rK \,\, \text{with respect to}  \, L, \,  K, \, \text{and} \, p$$

$$\text{subject to}$$

$$Q(p) = f\,(L, K),$$

where Q(p) is the market demand function for the product. The constraint equates the amount that can be sold to the amount produced. Here labor demand, capital demand, and the selling price are the choice variables, giving rise to the input demand functions

$$L(w, r),$$

$$K(w, r),$$

and the pricing function

$$p(w, r).$$

There is no output supply function for a monopolist, because a supply function pre-supposes the existence of an exogenous price.

The short-run labor demand function is derived the same way except with physical capital K being exogenous.

== Monopsonist in the labor market ==
If the firm is a perfect competitor in the goods market but is a monopsonist in the labor market — meaning that it is the only buyer of labor, so the amount it demands influences the wage rate — then its long-run optimization problem is

$$\text{Maximize} \,\, pQ - wL(w) - rK  \,\, \text{with respect to} \,\, Q, \, w, \, \text{and} \, K$$

$$\text{subject to}$$

$$Q = f\,(L(w), K),$$

where L(w) is the market labor supply function of workers which faces the firm. Here the firm cannot choose an amount of labor to demand independently of the wage rate, because the labor supply function links the quantity of labor that can be hired to the wage rate; therefore there is no labor demand function.

The short-run optimization is the same except that physical capital K is exogenous rather than being a choice variable.

== See also ==
- Factor market
- Conditional factor demands
- Labour economics
- Labour supply
- Wage slavery
- Personnel selection
- Price elasticity of demand
