= Nikaido =

Nikaido (written: 二階堂) may refer to:

- Nikaidō clan, a family of Japanese daimyō
- Nikaidō, an administrative division of the city of Kamakura, Japan

== People with the surname ==
- Susumu Nikaido (二階堂 進, 1909–2000), Japanese politician
- Hukukane Nikaido (二階堂 副包, 1923–2001), Japanese economist
- Miho Nikaido (二階堂 美穂, born 1966), Japanese actress
- Yukari Nikaido (二階堂 ゆかり, born 1967), Japanese singer
- Takashi Nikaido (二階堂 高嗣, born 1990), Japanese singer; see Good Ikuze!
- Fumi Nikaido (二階堂 ふみ, born 1994), Japanese actress
