= Committee for the Sveriges Riksbank Prize in Economic Sciences in Memory of Alfred Nobel =

Prize committee

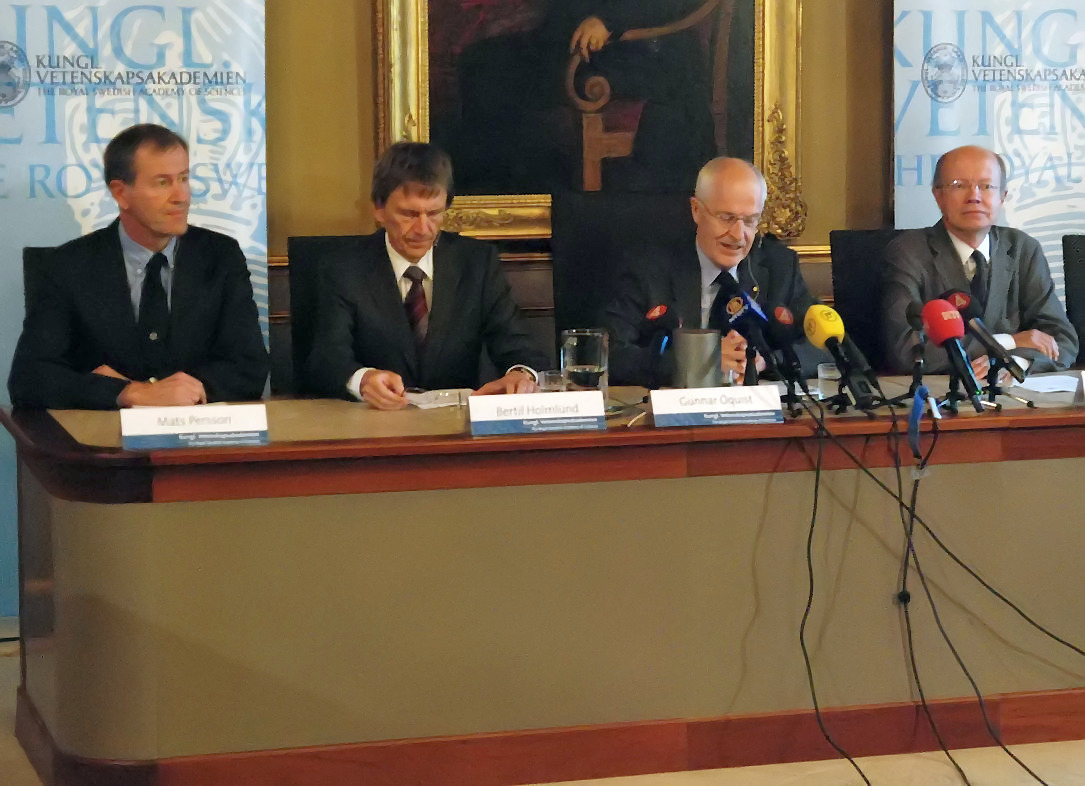
Announcement of the Alfred Nobel Memorial Prize in Economic sciences 2008

The Committee for the Sveriges Riksbank Prize in Economic Sciences in Memory of Alfred Nobel is the prize committee for the Nobel Memorial Prize in Economic Sciences, and fills the same role as the Nobel Committees do for the Nobel Prizes. This means that the committee is responsible for proposing laureates for the prize. The Committee for the Prize in Economic Sciences in Memory of Alfred Nobel is appointed by the Royal Swedish Academy of Sciences. It usually consists of Swedish professors of economics or related subjects who are members of the academy, although the academy in principle could appoint anyone to the committee. Two of the members of the founding committee as well as later members of the committee had also been associated with the Mont Pelerin Society.

The committee is a working body without decision power, and the final decision to award the prize is taken by the entire Royal Swedish Academy of Sciences, after having a first discussion in the academy's Class for Social Sciences.

== Current ==
=== Members of the 2018 Prize Committee ===
- Per Strömberg, Chairman
- Jakob Svensson
- Tomas Sjöström
- Peter Gärdenfors
- Per Krusell
- Eva Mörk

=== Secretary to the 2018 Prize Committee ===
The secretary takes part in Prize Committee meetings but cannot vote (by right). Unless, however, he or she has also been appointed as a Prize Committee full member—which entails the right to vote. (On a number of occasions, individuals have held both appointments.)

- Torsten Persson

== Former ==
=== Secretaries ===
- Ragnar Bentzel, 1969–1985
- Karl-Göran Mäler, 1986–1987
- Lars E. O. Svensson, 1991–1992
- Torsten Persson, 1993–2001
- Peter Englund, 2002––2013
- Torsten Persson, 2014–

=== Former members ===
Economics Prize Committee members from 1969 to 1984
Name	Years	Affiliation
Bertil Ohlin	Chairman 1969–1974	Stockholm School of Economics
Erik Lundberg	1969–1979 Chairman 1975–1979; Associate member 1980–	Stockholm School of Economics
Ingvar Svennilson	1969–1971	Stockholm University
Herman Wold	1969–1980	University of Uppsala University of Gothenburg
Assar Lindbeck	1969–1994 Chairman 1980–1994	Stockholm University
Ragnar Bentzel	1975–1990 Secretary 1969–1980, 1982–	University of Uppsala
Sune Carlson	1972–1979 Associate member 1980–	University of Uppsala
Lars Werin	1980–1991, 1995 Secretary 1981; Associate member 1975–1979	Stockholm University
Ingemar Ståhl	1981–1994	University of Lund
Karl-Göran Mäler	1982–1994	Stockholm School of Economics

- Bengt-Christer Ysander, 1991–1992
- Lars E. O. Svensson, 1993–2002 (chairman 1999–2002)
- Lennart Jörberg, (associate member 1993)
- Karl Gustav Jöreskog, 1995–2001
- Torsten Persson, 1995–2004 (chairman 2003–2004, also secretary)
- Lars Engwall, (associate member 2003–2008)
- Jakob Svensson, (associate member 2008)

Economics Prize Committee members from 1998 to 2008
Name	Years	Affiliation
Jörgen Weibull	1998–2007 Chairman 2004–2007	A.O. Wallenberg Professor of Economics; Stockholm School of Economics
Peter Englund	1993–1995 Secretary 1996–1997, 2002–	Professor of Banking and Insurance; Stockholm School of Economics
Lars Calmfors	1996–1998, 2003–2007	Professor of International Economics; Stockholm University
Bertil Näslund	1999	Professor; Stockholm School of Economics
Per Krusell	2003– Adjunct member 2003–2004	Professor of Economics; Princeton University
Karl-Gustaf Löfgren	2002–2007 Associate member 1993–1995	Professor of Economics; Umeå University
Timo Teräsvirta	2002–2010	Professor of Economic Statistics (emeritus); Stockholm School of Economics Professor of Econometrics; School of Economics and Management, University of Aarhus
Bertil Holmlund	Adjunct member 1998–2001, 2005–2006 Chairman 2008	Professor of Economics Uppsala University
