= Hirofumi Uzawa =

Japanese economist (1928–2014)

- 宇沢 弘文
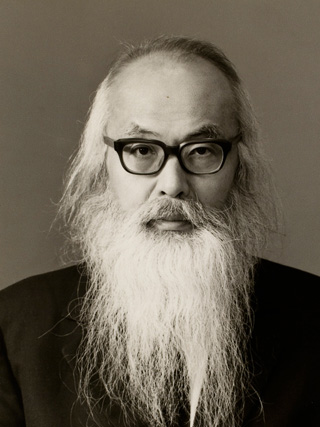
- Born: July 21, 1928; Yonago, Tottori, Japan
- Died: September 18, 2014 (aged 86); Tokyo, Japan

Academic background
- Education: University of Tokyo (B.Math, 1951); Stanford University; Tohoku University (Ph.D., 1962)
- Influences: Shokichi Iyanaga; Joichi Suetsuna; Kenneth Arrow; Hajime Kawakami

Academic work
- Discipline: Mathematical economics
- Institutions: Stanford University; University of California at Berkeley; University of Chicago; University of Tokyo; Chuo University; Doshisha University
- Doctoral students: David Cass; Karl Shell; Miguel Sidrauski
- Notable ideas: Uzawa two-sector growth model Uzawa iteration Uzawa condition Integrability of demand
- Awards: Person of Cultural Merit (1983); Order of Culture (1997); Blue Planet Prize (2009)
- Website: Information at IDEAS / RePEc

Hirofumi Uzawa (宇沢 弘文, Uzawa Hirofumi; July 21, 1928 – September 18, 2014) was a Japanese economist.

== Biography ==
Uzawa was born on July 21, 1928, in Yonago, Tottori to a farming family.

He attended the Tokyo First Middle School (currently the Hibiya High School) and the First Higher School, Japan (now the College of Arts and Sciences, University of Tokyo).

He graduated from the Mathematics Department of the University of Tokyo in 1951; he was a special research student from 1951 to 1953. At that time, he discovered the true nature of economics in the words of John Ruskin, “There is no wealth, but life.” which was quoted in the foreword to Tale of Poverty (貧乏物語, binbō monogatari) by Hajime Kawakami, and decided to study economics.

His paper on decentralized economic planning caught the eye of Kenneth Arrow at Stanford University. He went to study economics at Stanford University in 1956 with Fulbright fellowship, and became a research assistant, then assistant professor in 1956, then assistant professor at the University of California, Berkeley in 1960, and then associate professor at Stanford in 1961. In 1962, he received a Ph.D. from Tohoku University. He became a professor at the University of Chicago in 1964, and a professor of University of Tokyo's Department of Economics in 1969. He also taught at Niigata University, Chuo University, and United Nations University. Joseph E. Stiglitz and George A. Akerlof did research under Uzawa at the University of Chicago and David Cass studied under Uzawa at Stanford University.

Uzawa was a senior fellow at the Research Center of Social Common Capital at Doshisha University. He held the position of the president of the Econometric Society from 1976 to 1977. He also held the position of Counsel for the Development Bank of Japan's Research Institute of Capital Formation (RICF) from 1968 until his passing.

== Contributions ==
Uzawa initiated the field of mathematical economics in postwar days and formulated the growth theory of neoclassical economics. This is reflected in the Uzawa–Lucas model, the Uzawa iteration, the Uzawa condition, and Uzawa's Theorem, among others.

In his 1962 paper, Uzawa proved that the two of Walrasian equilibrium and Brouwer's fixed-point theorem are equivalent.

His 1965 model in which technical change is a result of macroeconomic investment was an early approach to endogenous growth theory. In these models, investments in R&D or education are chosen and have the effect of raising future economic growth rates.

== Recognition ==
- 1983: Person of Cultural Merit
- 1989: Member of Japan Academy
- 1995: National Academy of Sciences Visiting Fellow
- 1997: Order of Culture
- 2009: Blue Planet Prize
- Econometric Society Fellow (Lifetime)

== Bibliography ==
=== Books ===
- Arrow, Kenneth Joseph; Hurwicz, Leonid; Uzawa, Hirofumi (1958). Studies in linear and non-linear programming. Stanford mathematical studies in the social sciences. Vol. 2. Redwood City, California: Stanford University Press.
- Stiglitz, Joseph Eugene; Uzawa, Hirofumi (1969). Readings in the modern theory of economic growth. Cambridge, Massachusetts: MIT Press. ISBN 9780262190558.
- Uzawa, Hirofumi (1989). Preference, Production and Capital: Selected Papers of Hirofumi Uzawa. Cambridge, England: Cambridge University Press. ISBN 978-0521361743.
- Uzawa, Hirofumi (1989). Optimality, Equilibrium, and Growth: Selected Papers of Hirofumi Uzawa. Hongō, Bunkyō, Tokyo, Japan: University of Tokyo Press. ISBN 978-4130470414.
- Uzawa, Hirofumi (2003). Economic Theory and Global Warming. Cambridge, England: Cambridge University Press. ISBN 978-0521823869.
- Uzawa, Hirofumi (2005). Economic Analysis of Social Common Capital. Cambridge, England: Cambridge University Press. ISBN 978-0521847889.

=== Chapters in books ===
- Uzawa, Hirofumi (1958), "Iterative methods for concave programming", in Arrow, Kenneth J.; Hurwicz, Leonid; Uzawa, Hirofumi (eds.), Studies in linear and non-linear programming, Stanford, California: Stanford University Press, pp. 154–165.
- Uzawa, Hirofumi (1960), "Preference and rational choice in the theory of consumption", in Arrow, Kenneth J.; Karlin, Samuel; Suppes, Patrick (eds.), Mathematical models in the social sciences, 1959: Proceedings of the first Stanford symposium, Stanford mathematical studies in the social sciences, IV, Stanford, California: Stanford University Press, pp. 129–149, ISBN 9780804700214.
- Uzawa, Hirofumi (1968), "Time preference, the consumption function, and optimum asset holdings", in Wolfe, J.N. (ed.), Value, Capital and Growth, Edinburgh, Scotland, UK: Edinburgh University Press, pp. 485–504, ISBN 978-0852240205.
- Hurwicz, Leonid; Uzawa, Hirofumi (1971), "On the integrability of demand functions", in Chipman, John Somerset (ed.), Preferences, Utility and Demand, New York: Harcourt Brace Jovanovich, pp. 114–148, ISBN 978-0155710771.
- Uzawa, Hirofumi (1975), "Optimum Investment in Social Overhead Capital" (PDF), in Mills, Edwin S. (ed.), Economic Analysis of Environmental Problems, NBER, pp. 9–26, ISBN 978-0-87014-267-3.
- Uzawa, Hirofumi (1991), "Global warming initiatives: the Pacific Rim", in Dornbusch, Rudiger; Poterba, James M. (eds.), Global Warming: Economic Policy Responses, Cambridge, Massachusetts: MIT Press, pp. 275–321, ISBN 978-0262041263.

=== Selected journal articles ===
- Uzawa, Hirofumi (1956). "Note on preference and axioms of choice". Annals of the Institute of Statistical Mathematics. 8 (1): 35–40. doi:10.1007/BF02863564. S2CID 121301191.
- Uzawa, Hirofumi (1957). "Note on the Rational Selection of Decision Functions". Econometrica. 25 (1): 166–174. doi:10.2307/1907749. JSTOR 1907749.
- Uzawa, Hirofumi (1958). "A note on the Menger-Wieser theory of imputation". Zeitschrift für Nationalökonomie. 18 (3): 318–334. doi:10.1007/BF01317023. S2CID 154846224.
- Uzawa, Hirofumi (1959). "Prices of the Factors of Production in International Trade". Econometrica. 27 (3): 448–468. doi:10.2307/1909471. JSTOR 1909471.
- Uzawa, Hirofumi (1960). "Locally Most Powerful Rank Tests for Two-Sample Problems". Annals of Mathematical Statistics. 31 (3): 685–702. doi:10.1214/aoms/1177705795. JSTOR 2237578.
- Uzawa, Hirofumi (1960). "Walras' Tâtonnement in the Theory of Exchange" (PDF). Review of Economic Studies. 27 (3): 182–194. doi:10.2307/2296080. JSTOR 2296080. Archived from the original (PDF) on 2015-05-28.
- Uzawa, Hirofumi (1960). "Market Mechanisms and Mathematical Programming". Econometrica. 28 (4): 872–881. doi:10.2307/1907569. JSTOR 1907569.
- Nikaidô, Hukukane; Uzawa, Hirofumi (1960). "Stability and Non-Negativity in a Walrasian Tâtonnement Process". International Economic Review. 1 (1): 50–59. doi:10.2307/2525408. JSTOR 2525408.
- Arrow, Kenneth Joseph; Hurwicz, Leonid; Uzawa, Hirofumi (1961). "Constraint qualifications in maximization problems". Naval Research Logistics. 8 (2): 175–191. doi:10.1002/nav.3800080206.
- Uzawa, Hirofumi (1961). "A Comment on Newman's "Complete Ordering and Revealed Preference"". Review of Economic Studies. 28 (2): 140–141. doi:10.2307/2295712. JSTOR 2295712.
- Uzawa, Hirofumi (1961). "Neutral Inventions and the Stability of Growth Equilibrium". Review of Economic Studies. 28 (2): 117–124. doi:10.2307/2295709. JSTOR 2295709.
- Uzawa, Hirofumi (1961). "On a Two-Sector Model of Economic Growth". Review of Economic Studies. 29 (1): 40–47. doi:10.2307/2296180. JSTOR 2296180.
- Uzawa, Hirofumi (1961). "The Stability of Dynamic Processes" (PDF). Econometrica. 29 (4): 617–631. doi:10.2307/1911808. JSTOR 1911808. Archived from the original (PDF) on 2016-06-24.
- Uzawa, Hirofumi (1962). "On the Stability of Edgeworth's Barter Process" (PDF). International Economic Review. 3 (2): 218–232. doi:10.2307/2525426. JSTOR 2525426. Archived from the original (PDF) on 2016-07-01.
- Uzawa, Hirofumi (1962). "Walras's Existence Theorem and Brouwer's Fixed Point Theorem". Economic Studies Quarterly. 13 (1): 59–62.
- Uzawa, Hirofumi (1962). "Aggregative Convexity and the Existence of Competitive Equilibrium". Economic Studies Quarterly. 12 (2): 52–60.
- Uzawa, Hirofumi (1962). "Production Functions with Constant Elasticities of Substitution". Review of Economic Studies. 29 (4): 291–299. doi:10.2307/2296305. JSTOR 2296305.
- Uzawa, Hirofumi (1963). "On a Two-Sector Model of Economic Growth II". Review of Economic Studies. 30 (2): 105–118. doi:10.2307/2295808. JSTOR 2295808.
- Goldman, Steven Marc; Uzawa, Hirofumi (1964). "A Note on Separability in Demand Analysis". Econometrica. 32 (3): 387–398. doi:10.2307/1913043. JSTOR 1913043.
- Uzawa, Hirofumi (1964). "A Note on Professor Solow's Model of Technical Progress". Economic Studies Quarterly. 14 (3): 63–68.
- Uzawa, Hirofumi (1964). "Optimal Growth in a Two-Sector Model of Capital Accumulation". Review of Economic Studies. 31 (1): 1–24. doi:10.2307/2295932. JSTOR 2295932.
- Uzawa, Hirofumi (1964). "Duality Principles in the Theory of Cost and Production". International Economic Review. 5 (2): 216–220. doi:10.2307/2525564. JSTOR 2525564.
- Uzawa, Hirofumi (1965). "Optimum Technical Change in an Aggregative Model of Economic Growth" (PDF). International Economic Review. 6 (1): 18–31. doi:10.2307/2525621. JSTOR 2525621.
- Oniki, Hajime; Uzawa, Hirofumi (1965). "Patterns of Trade and Investment in a Dynamic Model of International Trade". Review of Economic Studies. 32 (1): 15–38. Bibcode:1965RvES...32...15O. doi:10.2307/2296328. JSTOR 2296328.
- Uzawa, Hirofumi (1969). "Time Preference and the Penrose Effect in a Two-Class Model of Economic Growth" (PDF). Journal of Political Economy. 77 (4): 628–652. doi:10.1086/259554. JSTOR 1829323. S2CID 154688691.
- Uzawa, Hirofumi (1971). "Diffusion of Inflationary Processes in a Dynamic Model of International Trade". Economic Studies Quarterly. 22 (1): 14–37.
- Uzawa, Hirofumi (1974). "Sur la théorie économique du capital collectif social". Cahiers du Séminaire d'Économétrie (15): 101–122. doi:10.2307/20075467. JSTOR 20075467.
- Uzawa, Hirofumi (1993). "Imputed prices of greenhouse gases and land forests". Renewable Energy. 3 (4–5): 499–511. Bibcode:1993REne....3..499U. doi:10.1016/0960-1481(93)90116-X.
- Uzawa, Hirofumi (1996). "Environment and Development Economics". Environmental Economics and Policy Studies. 1 (1): 1–2. doi:10.1017/S1355770X00000322. S2CID 155073354.
- Uzawa, Hirofumi (1996). "An endogenous rate of time preference, the Penrose effect, and dynamic optimality of environmental quality". PNAS. 93 (12): 5770–5776. Bibcode:1996PNAS...93.5770U. doi:10.1073/pnas.93.12.5770. PMC 39136. PMID 11607685.
- Uzawa, Hirofumi (1999). "Global warming as a cooperative game". Environmental Economics and Policy Studies. 2 (1): 1–37. Bibcode:1999EnEPS...2....1U. doi:10.1007/BF03353901. S2CID 154994852.

=== Working Papers ===
- Koopmans, Tjalling Charles; Uzawa, Hirofumi (1982). "Constancy and Constant Differences of Price Elasticities of Demand," Cowles Foundation Discussion Papers 654, Cowles Foundation for Research in Economics, Yale University.
