= Per Krusell =

Swedish economist

Per Lennart Krusell (born 1959) is a Swedish macroeconomic theorist who is currently the Torsten and Ragnar Soderberg Chair in Economics and the Institute for International Economic Studies, Stockholm University, as well as Centennial Professor of Economics at the London School of Economics.

Until recently, he was a professor of economics at Princeton University and, before that, held positions at the University of Rochester, the University of Pennsylvania, and Northwestern University. He received numerous awards and grants, most recently the 2007 Söderberg Prize and a 2.1 Million Euro 2008 senior research grant from the European Research Council. Krusell's research has focused on macroeconomics, broadly defined, with particular contributions in the areas of technological change, inequality, political economy, macroeconomic policy, and labor economics. He is currently pursuing a long-term project on the interactions between global climate change and the economy. He is especially known for developing the most widely used computational algorithm for calculating macroeconomic equilibrium under rational expectations in economies with heterogeneous agents and aggregate uncertainty when financial markets are incomplete. His work with Jeremy Greenwood and Zvi Hercowitz on investment-specific technological progress has also been extremely influential.

Krusell was elected a member of the Royal Swedish Academy of Sciences in 2003. Since 2003, he is a member of the Prize Committee for The Bank of Sweden Prize in Economic Sciences in Memory of Alfred Nobel, and its chair from 2011 to 2013. He served as the president of the European Economic Association in 2020.

== Influential publications ==
1. "Long-Run Implications of Investment-Specific Technological Progress",JSTOR 2951349 American Economic Review, June 1997, (with Jeremy Greenwood and Zvi Hercowitz). Casual empiricism suggests that technological progress is often embodied in the form of new and improved capital goods. Many examples come to mind: computers, robots, cell phones and the like. The paper analyzes the role of this type of technological change in U.S. economic growth. The results suggest that investment-specific technological progress accounts for the major part of U.S. economic growth over the postwar period.

2."The Role of Investment-Specific Technological Change in the Business Cycle",doi:10.1016/S0014-2921(98)00058-0 European Economic Review, 2000, (with Jeremy Greenwood and Zvi Hercowitz). This research incorporates the notion of investment-specific technological progress into a business cycle model.

== See also ==
- Per Krusell's homepage
- "Most widely held works by Per Krusell". WorldCat.
