= International Encyclopedia of Statistical Science =

Published by Springer

The International Encyclopedia of Statistical Science is a statistical sciences reference published by Springer. It has been described as one of the scientific projects with the largest number of involved countries ever, since it includes contributors coming from 105 countries and six continents. It contains the last papers written by Hirotugu Akaike, Nobel Laureate Sir Clive Granger, John Nelder and Erich Leo Lehmann.

The team has been nominated for the 2026 Nobel Peace Prize by qualified nominators from Cambodia and Spain, with additional nominations anticipated.

The first edition, in three volumes, was edited by Miodrag Lovrić and appeared in December 2010. It is published by Springer and it is available in print and online form.

== See also ==
- Encyclopedia of Statistical Sciences
