= Uzawa–Lucas model =

The Uzawa–Lucas model is an economic model that explains long-term economic growth as consequence of human capital accumulation. Developed by Robert Lucas, Jr., building upon initial contributions by Hirofumi Uzawa, it extends the AK model by a two-sector setup, in which physical and human capital are produced by different technologies. The Uzawa–Lucas model is part of endogenous growth theory.

== Background ==
Lucas' approaches in a series of papers published in the 1970s were a challenge to the classic principles of Keynesian economics when he suggested an amassed version of microeconomics models and then emphasized on human capital accumulation. In his 1988 dissertation, using Ramsey framework and Cobb–Douglas production function Lucas gave more attention to formal education rather than learning-by-doing. While in Solow-Swan model human capital is constant which leads to no transitional dynamics, Lucas measures total capital as the ratio of physical to human capital, not as a sum.

In the original paper, Lucas described the properties of both centralized and decentralized economics evolving with balanced paths.
