= Amiya Kumar Dasgupta =

Indian economist (1903–1992)

- Born: 16 July 1903; Bhanga, Bengal Presidency, British India
- Died: 14 January 1992 (aged 88); Shantiniketan, India
- Education: University of Dhaka (BA, MA); London School of Economics (PhD)

Amiya Kumar Dasgupta (16 July 1903 – 14 January 1992) was an Indian economist who has been described as "one of the founding fathers of modern economics in India" and "a true pioneer in developmental economics". He was the father of economist Sir Partha Dasgupta.

== Early life and education ==
Dasgupta was born in Bhanga, Faridpur district, in Bengal Presidency, British India (now Bangladesh). His childhood was spent in his paternal home in Gaila, a village in Barisal district.

Dasgupta obtained his Matriculation degree from Goila School (established in 1883 by his uncle, Rajanikanto Dasgupta) in 1920; his Intermediate degree from the Brojomohun College, Barisal, East Bengal, 1922, which was then affiliated with the University of Calcutta. He earned his B.A. and M.A. degrees in economics in 1925 and 1926 respectively as a student of the University of Dacca.

Between 1926 and 1946 Dasgupta was a lecturer in economics at Dacca University. On leave from his lectureship, he worked for a PhD in economics under Lionel Robbins at the London School of Economics in 1934–1936, being awarded his Ph.D. in 1936 for a dissertation with the title, "The Conception of Surplus in Theoretical Economics" (published in India during the war as a book). He was later elected Honorary Fellow there in 1978.

Among the earliest members of the Hindu diaspora from what is now Bangladesh, Dasgupta and his wife, Shanti, and their two children, Alakananda and Partha, migrated to Delhi in 1946. Apart from brief appointments abroad (Chief of the South Asia Division, International Monetary Fund, 1950–53; Commonwealth Visiting Fellow, University of Cambridge, 1963–64), he remained in India.

Dasgupta died on 14 January 1992 at Shantiniketan, India.

== Economic work ==
Dasgupta is widely acknowledged to have been India's leading economic theorist in the decades 1930–60 (he published a number of seminal articles and books on economic theory and the history of economic thought) and a pioneer in contemporary development economics. In his obituary, the Nobel Laureate Amartya Sen wrote, "(Dasgupta) was one of the true pioneers of development economics. He had also made substantial contributions to the history of economic ideas, and in particular to analyzing the diverse perspectives of alternative traditions of economic reasoning and their interconnections. He has important publications in at least a dozen other areas in economics ...".

Dasgupta was also a renowned teacher (among his students: S.R. Sen, Ashok Mitra, and Amartya Sen). In his obituary piece, Sen goes on to write, "... Dasgupta was a great teacher who could make the subject come alive with imagination, wit, lucidity, and a quality that I can only describe as astute compassion."

Dasgupta was one of the founders, in 1949, of the internationally known journal The Economic Weekly (current name, Economic and Political Weekly). He was President of the Indian Economic Association in 1959. In 2009 his collected works were published by Oxford University Press in three volumes (Two Treatises on Classical Political Economy (Vol. I), Essays in Economic Theory (Vol. II), and Essays in Planning and Public Policy (Vol. III)), compiled and edited by his daughter, Alaknanda Patel.

In 1955, Professor A. K. Dasgupta was part of the Panel of Economists advising on the Second Five Year Plan.

== Professional affiliations ==
- 1926-46: Lecturer, Dacca University
- 1946-47: Senior Lecturer, Sri Ram College of Commerce
- 1947: Professor, Ravenshaw College
- 1947-58: Professor, Banaras Hindu University
- 1955: Member, Panel of Economists, Second Five Year Plan
- 1958-61: Deputy Director General, National Council of Applied Economic Research, New Delhi
- 1961-65: Professor, Indian School of International Studies
- 1965-71: Director, A.N. Sinha Institute of Social Studies, Patna
- 1970-73: Member, Third Pay Commission of India
- 1976-82: Honorary Professor, Jawaharlal Nehru University

== Selected publications ==
- "Keynesian Economics and Underdeveloped Countries", Economic Weekly, January 1954 (reprinted on his birth centenary in Economic and Political Weekly 2003, Vol. 38, No. 28, pp. 2919–2922)
- Planning and Economic Growth (George Allen & Unwin, 1965)
- The Economics of Austerity (Oxford University Press, 1975)
- Epochs of Economic Theory (Basil Blackwell, 1985)
- The Collected Works of A.K. Dasgupta, Volume I: Two Treatises on Classical Political Economy, edited by Alaknanda Patel (Oxford University Press, 2009)
- The Collected Works of A.K. Dasgupta, Volume II: Essays in Economic Theory, edited by Alaknanda Patel (Oxford University Press, 2009)
- The Collected Works of A.K. Dasgupta, Volume III: Essays in Planning and Public Policy, edited by Alaknanda Patel (Oxford University Press, 2009)
