= S. Lynne Stokes =

American statistician

Sara Lynne Stokes
- Education: The University of the South; University of North Carolina at Chapel Hill
- Scientific career
- Fields: Statistics
- Workplaces: Vanderbilt University; University of Texas at Austin faculty Southern Methodist University

Sara Lynne Stokes is an American statistician at Southern Methodist University where she is a professor and chair of the Department of Statistical Science. Her research interests include the modeling of non-sampling errors, and mark and recapture methods; she is also an expert on opinion polls.

== Early life ==
Stokes' father was William Glenn Stokes, a mathematician who chaired the mathematics department at Austin Peay State University.

== Education ==
Stokes graduated summa cum laude in mathematics from the Sewanee: The University of the South in 1972, becoming the university's first female mathematics major to go on to a doctorate. She earned a master's degree and Ph.D. in mathematical statistics from the University of North Carolina at Chapel Hill in 1974 and 1976 respectively. Her dissertation, supervised by Norman Lloyd Johnson, was An Investigation of the Consequences of Ranked Set Sampling.

== Career ==
Stokes became a faculty at Vanderbilt University, but in 1979 began working for the U.S. Government as a statistician, first at the Patuxent Research Refuge of the U.S. Fish and Wildlife Service and then at the Census Bureau. She returned to academia in 1984, at the University of Texas at Austin, and moved to Southern Methodist in 2001.

== Awards and honors ==
Stokes is a fellow of the American Statistical Association. At Southern Methodist, she was the Dedman Family Distinguished Professor for 2013. In 2012 Stokes was recipient of the American Statistical Association Founders Award.
