= Uzawa's theorem =

Uzawa's theorem, also known as the steady-state growth theorem, is a theorem in economic growth that identifies the necessary functional form of technological change for achieving a balanced growth path in the Solow–Swan and Ramsey–Cass–Koopmans growth models. It was proved by Japanese economist Hirofumi Uzawa in 1961.

A general version of the theorem consists of two parts. The first states that, under the normal assumptions of the Solow-Swan and Ramsey models, if capital, investment, consumption, and output are increasing at constant exponential rates, these rates must be equivalent. The second part asserts that, within such a balanced growth path, the production function, $Y = \tilde{F}(\tilde{A},K,L)$ (where $A$ is technology, $K$ is capital, and $L$ is labor), can be rewritten such that technological change affects output solely as a scalar on labor (i.e. $Y = F(K,AL)$) a property known as labor-augmenting or Harrod-neutral technological change.

Uzawa's theorem has been viewed as showing a limitation of the Solow-Swan and Ramsey models. Imposing the assumption of balanced growth within such models requires that technological change be labor-augmenting. Conversely, a production function that cannot represent the effect of technology as a scalar augmentation of labor cannot produce a balanced growth path.

The theorem has important practical implications for applied macroeconomics, providing a rigorous justification for the common modeling practice of assuming labor-augmenting technical change. The classical two-factor theorem also faces an empirical puzzle, as the secular decline in the relative price of capital goods suggests the presence of capital-augmenting technical change, which is incompatible with balanced growth under a sub-unitary capital-labor elasticity of substitution. Recent work has generalized the theorem to economies with more than two factors of production, resolving this tension.

== Statement ==
Throughout this page, a dot over a variable will denote its derivative concerning time (i.e. $\dot{X}(t)\equiv {dX(t) \over dt}$). Also, the growth rate of a variable $X(t)$ will be denoted $g_X\equiv \frac{\dot{X}(t)}{X(t)}$.

Uzawa's theorem

The following version is found in Acemoglu (2009) and adapted from Schlicht (2006):

Model with aggregate production function $Y(t)=\tilde{F}(\tilde{A}(t),K(t),L(t))$, where $\tilde{F}:\mathbb{R}^2_+ \times \mathcal{A}\to \mathbb{R}_+$ and $\tilde{A}(t)\in \mathcal{A}$ represents technology at time t (where $\mathcal{A}$ is an arbitrary subset of $\mathbb{R}^N$ for some natural number $N$). Assume that $\tilde{F}$ exhibits constant returns to scale in $K$ and $L$. The growth in capital at time t is given by

$\dot{K}(t)=Y(t)-C(t)-\delta K(t)$

where $\delta$ is the depreciation rate and $C(t)$ is consumption at time t.

Suppose that population grows at a constant rate, $L(t)=\exp(nt)L(0)$, and that there exists some time $T < \infty$ such that for all $t\geq T$, $\dot{Y}(t)/Y(t)=g_Y>0$, $\dot{K}(t)/K(t)=g_K>0$, and $\dot{C}(t)/C(t)=g_C>0$. Then

1. $g_Y = g_K = g_C$; and

2. There exists a function $F:\mathbb{R}^2_+ \to \mathbb{R}_+$ that is homogeneous of degree 1 in its two arguments such that, for any $t \geq T$, the aggregate production function can be represented as $Y(t)=F(K(t),A(t)L(t))$, where $A(t)\in \mathbb{R}_+$ and $g \equiv \dot{A}(t)/A(t) =g_Y-n$.

== Sketch of proof ==
=== Lemma 1 ===
For any constant $\alpha$, $g_{X^\alpha Y}=\alpha g_X+g_Y$.

Proof: Observe that for any $Z(t)$, $g_{Z}= \frac{\dot{Z}(t)}{Z(t)}= \frac{d\ln Z(t)}{dt}$. Therefore, $g_{X^\alpha Y} = \frac{d}{dt}\ln [(X(t))^\alpha Y(t)]=\alpha\frac{d\ln X(t)}{dt}+\frac{d\ln Y(t)}{dt}=\alpha g_X+g_Y$.

=== Proof of theorem ===
We first show that the growth rate of investment $I(t)=Y(t)-C(t)$ must equal the growth rate of capital $K(t)$ (i.e. $g_I=g_K$)

The resource constraint at time $t$ implies

$$\dot{K}(t)=I(t)-\delta K(t)$$

By definition of $g_K$, $\dot{K}(t)=g_K K(t)$ for all $t\geq T$ . Therefore, the previous equation implies

$$g_K+\delta=\frac{I(t)}{K(t)}$$

for all $t\geq T$. The left-hand side is a constant, while the right-hand side grows at $g_I-g_K$ (by Lemma 1). Therefore, $0=g_I-g_K$ and thus

$$g_I=g_K$$.

From national income accounting for a closed economy, final goods in the economy must either be consumed or invested, thus for all $t$

$$Y(t)=C(t)+I(t)$$

Differentiating with respect to time yields

$$\dot{Y}(t)=\dot{C}(t)+\dot{I}(t)$$

Dividing both sides by $Y(t)$ yields

$$\frac{\dot{Y}(t)}{Y(t)}=\frac{\dot{C}(t)}{Y(t)}+\frac{\dot{I}(t)}{Y(t)}=\frac{\dot{C}(t)}{C(t)}\frac{C(t)}{Y(t)}+\frac{\dot{I}(t)}{I(t)}\frac{I(t)}{Y(t)}$$
$$\Rightarrow g_Y=g_C\frac{C(t)}{Y(t)}+g_I\frac{I(t)}{Y(t)}=g_C\frac{C(t)}{Y(t)}+g_I(1-\frac{C(t)}{Y(t)})=(g_C-g_I)\frac{C(t)}{Y(t)}+g_I$$

Since $g_Y, g_C$ and $g_I$ are constants, $\frac{C(t)}{Y(t)}$ is a constant. Therefore, the growth rate of $\frac{C(t)}{Y(t)}$ is zero. By Lemma 1, it implies that

$$g_c-g_Y=0$$

Similarly, $g_Y= g_I$. Therefore, $g_Y = g_C = g_K$.

Next we show that for any $t\geq T$, the production function can be represented as one with labor-augmenting technology.

The production function at time $T$ is

$$Y(T)=\tilde{F}(\tilde{A}(T), K(T), L(T))$$

The constant return to scale property of production ($\tilde{F}$ is homogeneous of degree one in $K$ and $L$) implies that for any $t\geq T$, multiplying both sides of the previous equation by $\frac{Y(t)}{Y(T)}$ yields

$$Y(T)\frac{Y(t)}{Y(T)}=\tilde{F}(\tilde{A}(T), K(T)\frac{Y(t)}{Y(T)}, L(T)\frac{Y(t)}{Y(T)})$$

Note that $\frac{Y(t)}{Y(T)}=\frac{K(t)}{K(T)}$ because $g_Y=g_K$(refer to solution to differential equations for proof of this step). Thus, the above equation can be rewritten as

$$Y(t)=\tilde{F}(\tilde{A}(T), K(t), L(T)\frac{Y(t)}{Y(T)})$$

For any $t\geq T$, define

$$A(t)\equiv\frac{Y(t)}{L(t)}\frac{L(T)}{Y(T)}$$

and

$$F(K(t),A(t)L(t))\equiv\tilde{F}(\tilde{A}(T), K(t), L(t)A(t))$$

Combining the two equations yields

$F(K(t),A(t)L(t))=\tilde{F}(\tilde{A}(T), K(t), L(T)\frac{Y(t)}{Y(T)})=Y(t)$ for any $t\geq T$.

By construction, $F(K,AL)$ is also homogeneous of degree one in its two arguments.

Moreover, by Lemma 1, the growth rate of $A(t)$ is given by

$\frac{\dot{A}(t)}{A(t)}=\frac{\dot{Y}(t)}{Y(t)}-\frac{\dot{L}(t)}{L(t)}=g_Y-n$. $\blacksquare$

== Practical implication ==
In applied macroeconomics, economists frequently need to specify a production function for an economy whose true technology is unknown or too complex to characterize exactly. Uzawa's theorem has an important practical implication in this context: it guarantees that, for any economy on a balanced growth path, there exists a labor-augmenting production function that can serve as a valid approximation of the true technology. This means that the common modeling practice of assuming purely labor-augmenting technical change is not merely a matter of analytical convenience, but is justified by the structure of balanced growth itself.

The concept of the Uzawa representation, introduced by Casey and Horii (2024), makes this precise. Given any neoclassical production function consistent with a balanced growth path, the Uzawa representation is a labor-augmenting form of the production function that approximates the true production function in a neighborhood of the BGP. On the BGP itself, the representation is exact in the sense that it reproduces the same levels of output and factor inputs as the true production function. Under additional conditions, the representation is also exact in terms of factor prices and the elasticity of substitution between factors. Off the BGP, the representation serves as a local approximation, with the quality of the approximation depending on which of these conditions are satisfied.

== Empirical puzzle ==
The classical two-factor Uzawa theorem implies that capital-augmenting technical change (KATC) is incompatible with balanced growth when the elasticity of substitution between capital and labor is not equal to one. This presents a significant empirical puzzle. Estimates of the capital-labor elasticity of substitution consistently find values below one, yet the price of capital goods relative to consumption goods has fallen secularly over the postwar period in the United States, as documented by the Federal Reserve Bank of St. Louis (FRED). A falling relative price of capital is widely interpreted as evidence that KATC is present in the economy. This phenomenon is closely related to investment-specific technological change (ISTC); for a discussion of the relationship between ISTC and KATC, see the article on investment-specific technological progress.

Grossman, Helpman, Oberfield, and Sampson (2017) documented this tension directly, showing that U.S. data is difficult to reconcile with the classical two-factor Uzawa theorem, and explored whether the introduction of human capital accumulation could resolve it.

== Generalization to multiple factors ==
Casey and Horii (2024) extend Uzawa's theorem to economies with more than two factors of production. They show that when capital has a unitary elasticity of substitution with at least one factor other than labor — even if the elasticity of substitution between capital and labor is less than one — balanced growth is consistent with the presence of KATC. This generalizes the classical result, under which a sub-unitary capital-labor elasticity of substitution would rule out KATC entirely.

The generalization also extends the Uzawa representation to the multifactor setting. For any neoclassical production function consistent with a BGP in a multifactor economy, a labor-augmenting representation exists that locally approximates the true production function near the BGP. A key practical benefit of the multifactor setting is that, when capital has a unitary elasticity of substitution with at least one other factor, the Uzawa representation can incorporate both labor-augmenting and capital-augmenting technical change simultaneously. This gives applied economists a richer and more flexible representation of technology than is available in the two-factor case, where the representation is necessarily purely labor-augmenting.

Together, the generalized theorem and the Uzawa representation reconcile three empirical observations that are jointly inconsistent under the classical two-factor theorem: the secular decline in the relative price of capital goods, estimates of a sub-unitary capital-labor elasticity of substitution, and the existence of balanced growth.

== See also ==
- Dynamic efficiency
- Growth accounting
