= Tomas Sjöström =

- Born: March 19, 1962 (age 63)
- Employer: Rutgers University – New Brunswick

Academic background
- Education: Stockholm University (BA); University of Rochester (PhD)
- Doctoral advisor: William Thomson

Academic work
- Doctoral students: Roland G. Fryer Jr.

Tomas Sjöström (born March 19, 1962) is a Distinguished Professor of Economics at Rutgers University – New Brunswick.

== Life ==
He graduated from Stockholm University with a bachelor's degree in business economics in 1985. He then continued to study economics at the University of Rochester, earning his Ph.D. in 1991.

Sjöström worked at Harvard University from 1991 to 1998. From 1998 to 2004, he served as Professor of Economics at the Pennsylvania State University before taking on the role of Professor of Economics at Rutgers University. He is a member of the Royal Swedish Academy of Sciences and served on the selection committee for the Nobel Memorial Prize in Economic Sciences from 2007 to 2018.

== Research contributions ==
Sjöström's early work was on the topic of Implementation Theory (the design of optimal mechanisms). Sandeep Baliga, Luis Corchon and Sjöström considered implementation when the mechanism designer himself is a player who cannot make "incredible threats". Tatsuyoshi Saijo, Takehiko Yamato and Sjöström argued that in many strategy-proof mechanisms, the incentive to choose the correct strategy is weak. To provide better incentives, they introduced "secure" mechanisms. Together with Timothy Cason, they provided experimental evidence in favor of secure mechanisms. Ashok Rai and Sjöström showed that the Grameen Bank's group lending scheme is an optimal lending mechanism. Sjöström has co-authored several fMRI studies. One study contrasted dominance-solvable games with pure coordination games. Different brain areas became activated in the two kinds of games, which provided support for dual-process theories that distinguish between intuition and reasoning. More recently, Sjöström has worked with Sandeep Baliga on theoretical models of the Hobbesian trap, where conflict is caused by mutual fear.

== Selected publications ==
- “Decentralization and Collusion” with S. Baliga, Journal of Economic Theory (1998) 83:196-232.
- Ghatak, Maitreesh; Morelli, Massimo; Sjöström, Tomas (2001). "Occupational Choice and Dynamic Incentives". The Review of Economic Studies. 68 (4): 781–810. doi:10.1111/1467-937X.00190. ISSN 0034-6527. JSTOR 2695909.
- Baliga, Sandeep; Sjöström, Tomas (2004). "Arms Races and Negotiations". The Review of Economic Studies. 71 (2): 351–369. doi:10.1111/0034-6527.00287. ISSN 0034-6527. JSTOR 3700629.
- Baliga, Sandeep; Sjöström, Tomas (2024). "Causes of War" in Handbook of the Economics of Conflict, Vol. 1. https://doi.org/10.1016/bs.hoec.2024.10.004
- Baliga, Sandeep; Corchon, Luis; Sjöström, Tomas (1997). "The Theory of Implementation when the Planner is a Player", Journal of Economic Theory 77:15-33. https://doi.org/10.1006/jeth.1997.2318
- Cason, Timothy; Saijo, Tatsuyoshi; Sjöström, Tomas; Yamato, Takehiko (2006). "Secure Implementation Experiments: Do Strategy-proof Mechanisms Really Work?" Games and Economic Behavior 57:206-235. https://doi.org/10.1016/j.geb.2005.12.007
- Rai, Ashok S.; Sjöström, Tomas (2004). "Is Grameen Lending Efficient? Repayment Incentives and Insurance in Village Economies". The Review of Economic Studies. 71 (1): 217–234. doi:10.1111/0034-6527.00282. ISSN 0034-6527. JSTOR 3700717.
- Saijo, Tatsuyoshi; Sjöström, Tomas; Yamato, Takehiko (2007). "Secure Implementation", Theoretical Economics 2:203–229
- Kuo, Wen-Jui; Sjöström, Tomas; Chen, Yu-Ping; Wang, Yen-Hsiang; Huang, Chen-Ying (2009-04-24). "Intuition and Deliberation: Two Systems for Strategizing in the Brain". Science. 324 (5926): 519–522. doi:10.1126/science.1165598. ISSN 0036-8075. PMID 19390048.
- Chung, Hui-Kuan; Sjöström, Tomas; Lee, Hsin-Ju; Lu, Yi-Ta; Tsuo, Fu-Yun; Chen, Tzai-Shuen; Chang, Chi-Fu; Juan, Chi-Hung; Kuo, Wen-Jui; Huang, Chen-Ying (2017-11-29). "Why Do Irrelevant Alternatives Matter? An fMRI-TMS Study of Context-Dependent Preferences". Journal of Neuroscience. 37 (48): 11647–11661. doi:10.1523/JNEUROSCI.2307-16.2017. ISSN 0270-6474. PMC 6705742. PMID 29109242.
