= Japan Statistical Society =

The Japan Statistical Society (日本統計学会, Nihon Tokei Gakkai, JSS) is a learned society in Japan. The Society's objective is "To promote research and education in the area of statistics, and to contribute to the progress of statistical sciences". JSS was founded in 1931. Its membership consists of researchers, teachers, and professional statisticians in many different fields.

As of 2020 Shigeru Kawasaki (川崎 茂, Kawasaki Shigeru) of Nihon University is the president (term ends June 2021) and Satoshi Yamashita (山下 智志, Yamashita Satoshi) of the Institute of Statistical Mathematics is the director-general (term ends June 2021).

JSS publications include Journal of the Japan Statistical Society (English series, biannual), Journal of the Japan Statistical Society (Japanese series, biannual), a quarterly newsletter, and JSS Research Series in Statistics.

JSS is an affiliate of the International Statistical Institute.

== See also ==
- Statistics Bureau (Japan)
