= Uzawa iteration =

In numerical mathematics, the Uzawa iteration is an algorithm for solving saddle point problems. It is named after Hirofumi Uzawa and was originally introduced in the context of concave programming.

== Basic idea ==
We consider a saddle point problem of the form

$$\begin{pmatrix} A & B\\ B^* & \end{pmatrix} \begin{pmatrix} x_1\\ x_2 \end{pmatrix}
= \begin{pmatrix} b_1\\ b_2 \end{pmatrix},$$

where $A$ is a symmetric positive-definite matrix. Multiplying the first row by $B^* A^{-1}$ and subtracting from the second row yields the upper-triangular system

$$\begin{pmatrix} A & B\\ & -S \end{pmatrix} \begin{pmatrix} x_1\\ x_2 \end{pmatrix}
= \begin{pmatrix} b_1\\ b_2 - B^* A^{-1} b_1 \end{pmatrix},$$

where $S := B^* A^{-1} B$ denotes the Schur complement. Since $S$ is symmetric positive-definite, we can apply standard iterative methods like the gradient descent method or the conjugate gradient method to solve

$$S x_2 = B^* A^{-1} b_1 - b_2$$

in order to compute $x_2$. The vector $x_1$ can be reconstructed by solving

$$A x_1 = b_1 - B x_2. \,$$

It is possible to update $x_1$ alongside $x_2$ during the iteration for the Schur complement system and thus obtain an efficient algorithm.

== Implementation ==
We start the conjugate gradient iteration by computing the residual

$$r_2 := B^* A^{-1} b_1 - b_2 - S x_2 = B^* A^{-1} (b_1 - B x_2) - b_2 = B^* x_1 - b_2,$$

of the Schur complement system, where

$$x_1 := A^{-1} (b_1 - B x_2)$$

denotes the upper half of the solution vector matching the initial guess $x_2$ for its lower half. We complete the initialization by choosing the first search direction

$$p_2 := r_2.\,$$

In each step, we compute

$$a_2 := S p_2 = B^* A^{-1} B p_2 = B^* p_1$$

and keep the intermediate result

$$p_1 := A^{-1} B p_2$$

for later. The scaling factor is given by

$$\alpha := p_2^* a_2 /p_2^* r_2$$

and leads to the updates

$$x_2 := x_2 + \alpha p_2, \quad r_2 := r_2 - \alpha a_2.$$

Using the intermediate result $p_1$ saved earlier, we can also update the upper part of the solution vector

$$x_1 := x_1 - \alpha p_1.\,$$

Now we only have to construct the new search direction by the Gram–Schmidt process, i.e.,

$$\beta := r_2^* a_2 / p_2^* a_2,\quad p_2 := r_2 - \beta p_2.$$

The iteration terminates if the residual $r_2$ has become sufficiently small or if the norm of $p_2$ is significantly smaller than $r_2$ indicating that the Krylov subspace has been almost exhausted.

== Modifications and extensions ==
If solving the linear system $A x=b$ exactly is not feasible, inexact solvers can be applied.

If the Schur complement system is ill-conditioned, preconditioners can be employed to improve the speed of convergence of the underlying gradient method.

Inequality constraints can be incorporated, e.g., in order to handle obstacle problems.
