= Ingemar Ståhl =

Swedish economist (1938–2014)

- Born: Ingemar Oskar Lennart Ståhl; June 2, 1938; Stockholm, Sweden
- Died: February 6, 2014 (aged 75); Lund, Sweden
- Education: Stockholm University; Lund University
- Occupations: Economist, professor
- Board member of: Ragnar Söderberg Foundation
- Spouse: Solveig Ståhl
- Children: 3

Ingemar Ståhl (June 2, 1938 – February 6, 2014) was a Swedish economist and an economics professor from Lund University.

== Life ==
Ståhl was born on June 2, 1938, in Stockholm, Sweden.

He graduated, with a bachelor degree, in 1958 in the Stockholm University. He earned his Licentiate of Philosophy in 1965 at the Lund University.

Ståhl was married to Solveig Ståhl, whom he had three children: Nils Ståhl, Pernilla Ståhl, and Ingela Ståhl. He died on February 6, 2014, in Lund, Sweden at the age of 75.

== Career ==
For 25 years, Ståhl was a member of Ragnar Söderberg Foundation, an organization dedicated to scientific researches. Ståhl has also worked as an Advisor to the Cabinet Office of the Government of Sweden and the Organisation for Economic Co-operation and Development (OECD). Since 1982, he was also a member of the Royal Swedish Academy of Engineering Sciences.

=== Nobel Prize ===
Ståhl was part of the Committee for the Prize in Economic Sciences in Memory of Alfred Nobel from 1969 until 1984. His committee duties included proposing laureates for the Prize.
