= Miguel Sidrauski =

Argentine economist (1939–1968)

- Born: October 12, 1939; Buenos Aires, Argentina
- Died: September 1, 1968 (aged 28)

Academic background
- Education: University of Chicago
- Doctoral advisor: Hirofumi Uzawa; Milton Friedman
- Influences: Arnold Harberger

Academic work
- Discipline: Monetary economics
- Institutions: Massachusetts Institute of Technology

Miguel Sidrauski (October 12, 1939 – September 1, 1968) was an Argentine economist who made important contributions to the theory of economic growth by developing a modified version of the Ramsey–Cass–Koopmans model to describe the effects of money on long-run growth. He also published an article on exchange rate determination. Sidrauski taught economics at Massachusetts Institute of Technology.

== Life and career ==
Sidrauski was born and educated in Buenos Aires. He entered graduate studies at the University of Chicago in 1963 and completed his PhD in 1966 under the supervision of Hirofumi Uzawa and Milton Friedman. After completing his PhD, he was appointed as an assistant professor at MIT. Sidrauski, who was Jewish, was described by his colleague Duncan K. Foley as "a committed Zionist." He died of cancer at the age of 28, and was surrounded by his wife and two-month-old daughter.

Sidrauski is best known for his 1967 article, "Rational Choice and Patterns of Growth in a Monetary Economy," which was based on his PhD dissertation. The article analyses a model of a representative household that intertemporally maximises utility, which in turn depends on both the consumption of goods and the holding of real balances of money. The model implies that in steady state, capital intensity is invariant to the rate of monetary expansion or contraction, a result that is described as superneutrality of money.

== Selected publications ==
- Foley, Duncan K.; Sidrauski, Miguel (1970). "Portfolio Choice, Investment, and Growth". American Economic Review. 60 (1): 44–63. JSTOR 1807854.
- Shell, K.; Sidrauski, M.; Stiglitz, J. E. (1969). "Capital Gains, Income, and Saving". Review of Economic Studies. 36 (1): 15–26. doi:10.2307/2296339. hdl:1721.1/63391. JSTOR 2296339.
- Sidrauski, Miguel (1967). "Inflation and Economic Growth". Journal of Political Economy. 75 (6): 796–810. doi:10.1086/259360. JSTOR 1829572. S2CID 153472492.
- Sidrauski, Miguel (1967). "Rational Choice and Patterns of Growth in a Monetary Economy". American Economic Review. 57 (2): 534–544.
