= Institute of Statistical Mathematics =

Japanese research institute

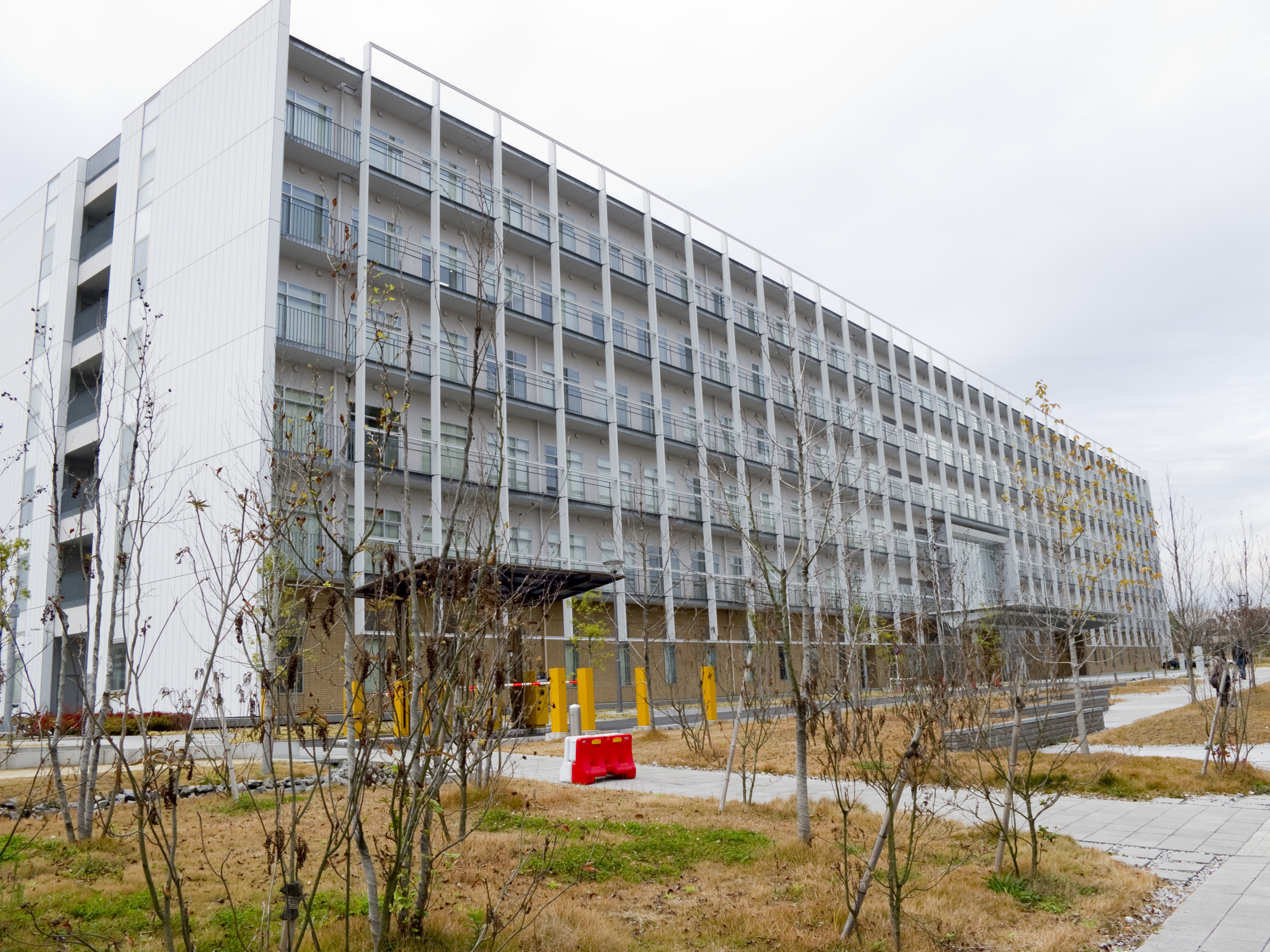
The facilities in Tachikawa.

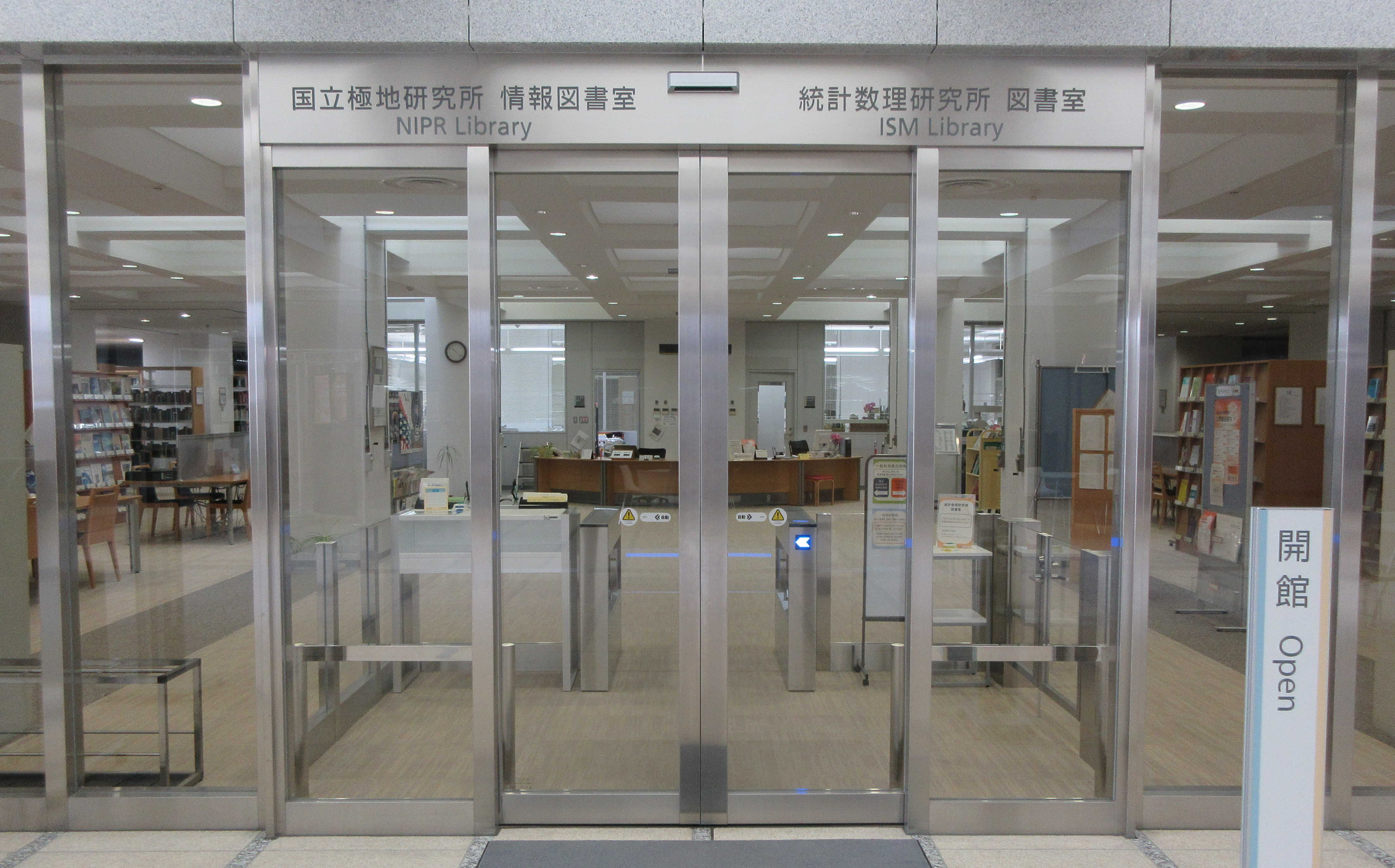
ISM Library

The Institute of Statistical Mathematics is Japan's national research institute for statistical science. In October 2009, it relocated from the Azabu district of Tokyo to Tachikawa. Founded in 1944, since 2004 it has been part of the Research Organization of Information and Systems (情報・システム研究機構).

The Institute is represented on the national Coordinating Committee for Earthquake Prediction.

== Notable faculty ==
- Hirotugu Akaike
- Sōichi Kakeya
- Genshiro Kitagawa
- Motosaburo Masuyama
- Yosihiko Ogata
- Joichi Suetsuna
- Genichi Taguchi

== Publications ==
The Institute publishes the scientific journal Annals of the Institute of Statistical Mathematics and the time series analysis software package TIMSAC.
