= Karl-Göran Mäler =

Swedish economist (1939–2020)

- Born: 1939; Sollefteå, Sweden
- Died: 20 May 2020 (aged 80–81); Stockholm, Sweden
- Employer: Stockholm School of Economics
- Known for: Environmental and ecological economics

Academic background
- Education: Stockholm University; Massachusetts Institute of Technology; Stanford University

Academic work
- Discipline: Economics, ecological economics
- Awards: Volvo Environment Prize (2002)

Karl-Göran Mäler (1939 – 20 May 2020) was a Swedish economist known for his work in economics and ecological economics.

Mäler was born in 1939 in Sollefteå, Sweden. He studied mathematics, statistics and economics at Stockholm University. He later pursued graduate studies in economics at the Massachusetts Institute of Technology and Stanford University in the United States. He received his doctorate from Stockholm University in 1972.

From 1975 to 2002 Mäler was a professor at the Stockholm School of Economics. He was elected to the Royal Swedish Academy of Sciences in 1981 and served on its Committee for the Sveriges Riksbank Prize in Economic Sciences in Memory of Alfred Nobel until 1994.

In 1992 Mäler and Partha Dasgupta founded the Beijer Institute of Ecological Economics. Mäler served as the institute's director until 2006. In 2002 he and Dasgupta shared the Volvo Environment Prize.

Mäler died in a retirement home in Stockholm on 20 May 2020.
