= Encyclopedia of Statistical Sciences =

The Encyclopedia of Statistical Sciences is an encyclopaedia of statistics published by John Wiley & Sons.

The first edition, in nine volumes, was published in 1982; it was edited by Norman Lloyd Johnson and Samuel Kotz. The second edition, in 16 volumes, was published in 2006; the senior editor was Samuel Kotz.

== See also ==
- International Encyclopedia of Statistical Science
