= Partha Dasgupta =

British economist (born 1942)

Professor Sir Partha Dasgupta GBE FRS FBA
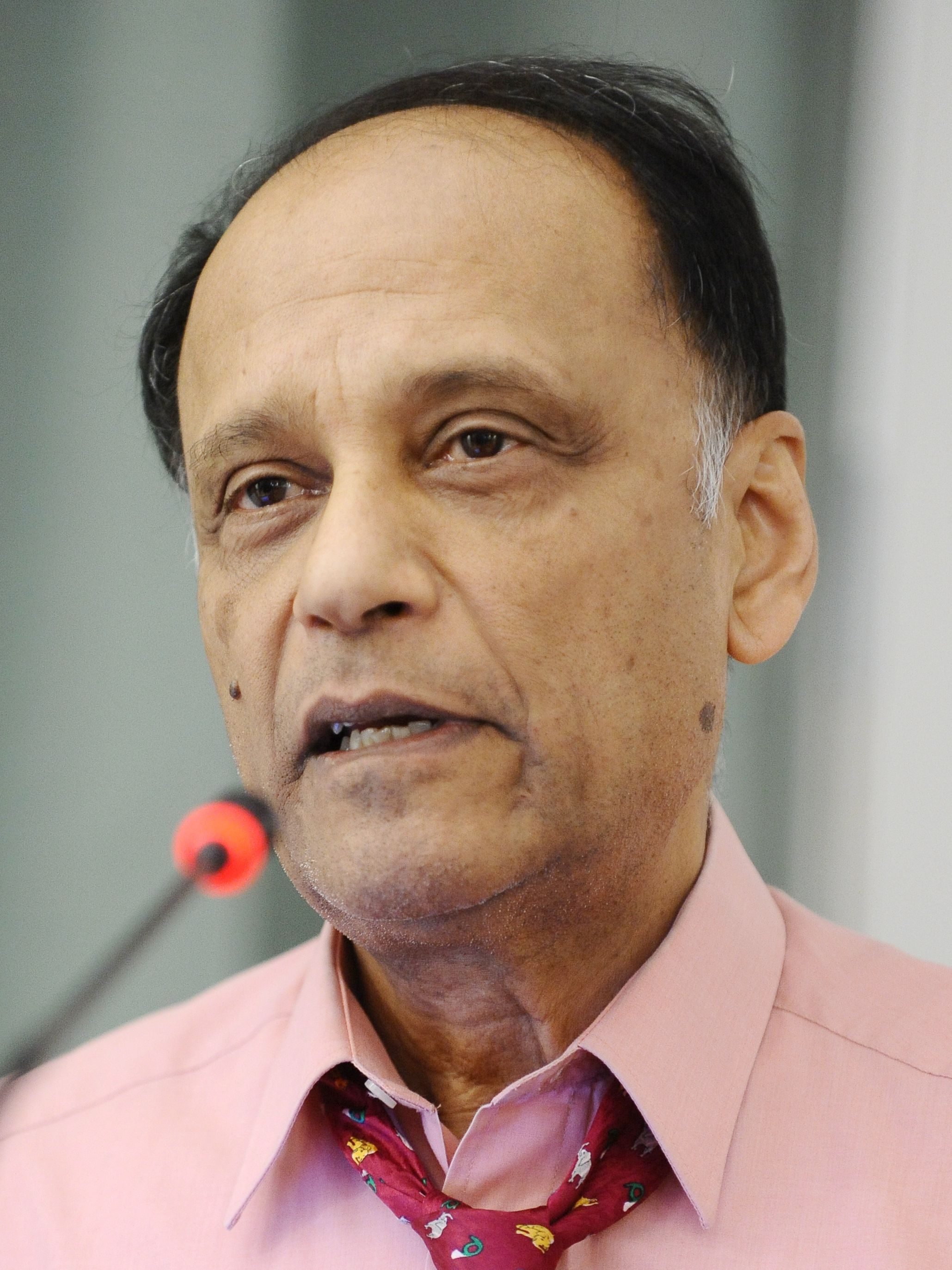
- Dasgupta in 2013
- Born: Partha Sarathi Dasgupta; 17 November 1942 (age 84); Dacca, Bengal Presidency, British India
- Spouse: Carol Dasgupta (m. 1968)
- Children: 3
- Relatives: Amiya Kumar Dasgupta (father)

Academic background
- Education: Hansraj College, Delhi (BSc) Delhi University; Trinity College, Cambridge (BA, PhD)
- Doctoral advisor: James Mirrlees
- Influences: Amiya Kumar Dasgupta; Kenneth Arrow; Paul Ehrlich; Peter Raven; John Rawls; Robert Solow

Academic work
- Discipline: Ecological economics
- Institutions: University of Cambridge; London School of Economics
- Awards: Volvo Environment Prize (2002); ISEE Kenneth Boulding Award for Ecological Economics (2004); PEN/John Kenneth Galbraith Award (2007); Zayed International Prize for the Environment (2011); Blue Planet Prize (2015); Tyler Prize for Environmental Achievement (2016); Kew International Medal (2021); Champions of the Earth (2022); BBVA Foundation Frontiers of Knowledge Award (2023)

Sir Partha Sarathi Dasgupta (born 17 November 1942) is an Indian-British economist who is Frank Ramsey Professor Emeritus of Economics at the University of Cambridge, United Kingdom, and a fellow of St John's College, Cambridge.

== Personal life ==
He was born into a Bengali Baidya Brahmin family in Dhaka, and raised mainly in Varanasi, India, and is the son of the noted economist Amiya Kumar Dasgupta. He is married to Carol Dasgupta, who is a psychotherapist. They have three children, Zubeida (who is an educational psychologist), Shamik (a professor of philosophy), and Aisha (who is a demographer and works on the practice of family planning and reproductive health). His father-in-law was James Meade.

== Education ==
Dasgupta was educated in Rajghat Besant School in Varanasi, India, obtaining his Matriculation Degree in 1958, and pursued undergraduate studies in Physics at Hans Raj College, University of Delhi, India, graduating in 1962 and in Mathematics at Cambridge (Trinity College), graduating in 1965. He was elected a member of the Apostles, a well-known discussion society at the university. He obtained a PhD in economics at Cambridge in 1968 with thesis titled Population, growth and non-transferable capital (investigations in the theory of optimum economic growth). His PhD supervisor was Sir James Mirrlees, also a member of the Apostles.

== Career ==
=== Research ===
His research interests have covered welfare and development economics; the economics of technological change; population, environmental, and resource economics; social capital; the theory of games; ecological economics, and the economics of malnutrition.

Dasgupta had a long-standing collaboration with the late Karl-Goran Maler, with whom he developed the concept of 'inclusive wealth' as a measure of human well-being and helped to establish (with a grant from the McArthur Foundation, channelled through the Beijer Institute of Ecological Economics, Stockholm) the South Asian Network for Development and Environmental Economics (SANDEE), based in Kathmandu, which since 1999 has conducted annual teaching and research workshops on ecological economics for young economists based in Bangladesh, Bhutan, India, Nepal, Pakistan, and Sri Lanka. Simultaneously, Dasgupta and Maler helped to launch the journal Environmental and Development Economics (Cambridge University Press) so as to enable economists in Asia, Africa, and Latin America to publish original research in a western journal.

Although Dasgupta has worked on research problems in a number of fields, his long-standing interest has been ecological economics, beginning with his Ph.D. thesis in which he placed he problem of optimum population and saving in a model of economic possibilities in which the biosphere set limits on economic growth. His 1982 monograph, 'The Control of Resources', set an agenda for future research at the nexus of population, consumption, and the natural environment, which he has pursued step by step in a long series of journal articles and books.

In 2019 he led production of a report on the economics of biodiversity, commissioned by the UK government, and published in February 2021 with the title 'The Economics of Biodiversity: The Dasgupta Review'. An important objective was to develop a new measure to account for the capital inherent in the natural world (economist today call that 'natural capital') that could be used as an ingredient in, among other things, the evaluation of investment projects and assessment of the sustainability of economic programmes. However, as Dasgupta writes in the Preface, the Review is an investigation into a larger concern, in that it reconstructs contemporary growth and development economics and the economics of poverty by recognising that the human economy is embedded in Nature, it is not external to Nature. The Review explores the far reaching implications of the altered perspective.

=== Appointments ===
Dasgupta taught at the London School of Economics (Lecturer 1971–1975; Reader 1975–1978; Professor of Economics 1978–1984) and moved to the University of Cambridge in January 1985 as Professor of Economics (and Professorial Fellow of St John's College), where he served as Chair of the Faculty of Economics between 1997 and 2001. From 1989 until 1992 he was on leave from the University of Cambridge and served as Professor of Economics, Professor of Philosophy, and Director of the Program in Ethics in Society at Stanford University, USA. In October 1991 he returned to Cambridge, on leave from Stanford University, to re-assume his chair at Cambridge. He resigned from Stanford in 1992 and has remained in Cambridge since then. In 1994 his chair was named by the University of Cambridge the Frank Ramsey Professorship of Economics.

=== Academic activities ===
From 1991 to 1997, Dasgupta was Chairman of the (Scientific Advisory) Board of the Beijer International Institute of Ecological Economics of the Royal Swedish Academy of Sciences, Stockholm. During 1999–2009 he served as a Founder Member of the Management and Advisory Committee of the South Asian Network for Development and Environmental Economics (SANDEE), based in Kathmandu. In 1996 he helped to establish the journal Environment and Development Economics, published by Cambridge University Press, whose purpose has been not only to publish original research at the interface of poverty and the environmental-resource base, but also to provide an opportunity to scholars in poor countries to publish their findings in an international journal.

During 2008-2013 he was a Professorial Research Fellow at the University of Manchester's Sustainable Consumption Institute (SCI). He was also an Andrew D. White Professor-at-Large from 2007 until 2013 at Cornell University and from 2010 until 2011 President of the European Association of Environmental and Resource Economists (EAERE). He has been a patron of the population concern charity Population Matters (formerly the Optimum Population Trust) since 2008. During 2011-2014 he was Chairman of the Scientific Advisory Board of the International Human Dimensions Programme (IHDP) on Global Environmental Change, Bonn. He served as Chair of the Central Government Expert Group on Green National Accounting for India which submitted its report in 2013. He was Chairman of the Management Committee of the Centre for the Study of Existential Risk at the University of Cambridge (2012-2020).

== Honours ==
Dasgupta has been honoured by elections as: Fellow of the Econometric Society; Fellow of the British Academy; Fellow of the Royal Society; Fellow of the Society for the Advancement of Economic Theory; Fellow of the Association of Environmental and Resource Economics; Fellow of the European Association of Environmental and Resource Economics; Fellow of the Society for Cost-Benefit Analysis; Member of the Pontifical Academy of Social Sciences (1997-2020); Fellow of The World Academy of Sciences (formally the Academy of Science for the Developing World); Member of Academia Europaea; Foreign Member of the Royal Swedish Academy of Sciences; Foreign Honorary Member of the American Academy of Arts and Sciences; Foreign Associate of the US National Academy of Sciences; Foreign Member of the American Philosophical Society; Foreign Member of Istituto Veneto di Scienze, Lettere ed Arti; Honorary Fellow of the London School of Economics; Honorary Fellow of Trinity College, Cambridge; Honorary Fellow of Trinity Hall, Cambridge Honorary Member of the American Economic Association; and Distinguished Fellow, CES, LMU Munich.

Dasgupta was President of the Royal Economic Society (1998–2001), the European Economic Association (1999), Section F (Economics) of the BA (British Association for the Advancement of Science) Festival of Science (2006), and the European Association of Environmental and Resource Economists (2010–2011).

Dasgupta was knighted in the 2002 Birthday Honours for services to economics. He was appointed Knight Grand Cross of the Order of the British Empire (GBE) in the 2023 New Year Honours for services to economics and the natural environment.

Two collections of essays have been published in his honour:

"Environment & Development Economics: Essays in Honour of Sir Partha Dasgupta," edited by S. Barrett, K.-G. Maler, and E.S. Maskin (Oxford: Oxford University Press), 2014.

"Sustainable Consumption: Multi-Disciplinary Perspectives in Honour of Professor Sir Partha Dasgupta," edited by D. Southerton and A. Ulph (Oxford: Oxford University Press), 2014.

=== Prizes and awards ===
Dasgupta was co-recipient (with Karl-Göran Mäler) of the 2002 Volvo Environment Prize; and (also with Mäler) of the 2004 Boulding Award of the International Society for Ecological Economics;, co-recipient (with Geoffrey Heal) of the Association of Environmental and Resource Economists' "Publication of Enduring Quality Award 2003" for their book, Economic Theory and Exhaustible Resources; recipient of the PEN/John Kenneth Galbraith Award, 2007, of the American Agricultural Economics Association; recipient of the Zayed International Environment Prize (II: scientific and technological achievements) in 2011; and recipient of the European Lifetime Achievement Award (in Environmental and Resource Economics) from the European Association of Environmental and Resource Economists, 2014. In 2007, together with Eric Maskin he was awarded the Erik Kempe Award in Environmental and Resource Economics, a joint prize of the Kempe Foundation and the European Association of Environmental and Resource Economists (EAERE). He was awarded the 2015 Blue Planet Prize for Environmental Research, the 2016 Tyler Prize, and the Kew International Medal, 2021 of the Royal Botanical Garden, Kew. In 2022 he was honoured by Freedom of the City of London by Special Invitation. The same year he was awarded the Champions of the Earth award for Science and Innovation by the UNEP. For 2023 he was awarded the BBVA Foundation Frontiers of Knowledge Award in the category "Economics, Finance and Management".

Dasgupta was awarded a Doctorate (Honoris Causa) by Wageningen University, 2000; Catholic University of Louvain, 2007; Faculte Université Saint-Louis, 2009; University of Bologna, 2010; Tilburg University, 2012; Harvard University, 2013; University of York, 2017.

== Selected publications ==
- Guidelines for Project Evaluation (with S. A. Marglin and A. K. Sen), United Nations, 1972.
- Economic Theory and Exhaustible Resources (with G. M. Heal), Cambridge University Press, 1979.
- "Utilitarianism, information and rights" in Sen, Amartya; Williams, Bernard, eds. (1982). Utilitarianism and beyond. Cambridge: Cambridge University Press. pp. 199–218. ISBN 9780511611964.
- The Control of Resources, Harvard University Press, 1982.
- An Inquiry into Well-Being and Destitution. Oxford: Clarendon, 1993. (Pub. description)
- Social Capital: A Multifaceted Perspective (co-editor with Ismail Serageldin). Washington, D.C.: World Bank, 2000. * (book preview except pp. 217–401, 403–25)
- Human Well-Being and the Natural Environment. Oxford: Oxford University Press, 2001, Rev. ed. 2004.
- Economics: A Very Short Introduction. Oxford: Oxford University Press, 2007. (OUP Website)
- Selected Papers of Partha Dasgupta: Vol.1, Institutions, Innovations, and Human Values; Vol. 2, Poverty, Population, and Natural Resources. Oxford: Oxford University Press, 2010.
