= Nobel Memorial Prize in Economic Sciences =

Award established in 1968 by Sveriges Riksbank

The Sveriges Riksbank Prize in Economic Sciences in Memory of Alfred Nobel
- Awarded for: Outstanding contributions to mankind in the field of Economic Sciences
- Sponsored by: Sveriges Riksbank
- Location: Stockholm, Sweden
- Country: Sweden
- Presented by: Nobel Foundation, Royal Swedish Academy of Sciences
- Formerly called: Prize in Economic Sciences in Memory of Alfred Nobel
- Reward: 12 million Swedish kronor (2026)
- First award: 1968
- Most recent recipients: Robert E. Hall; Michael Woodford

Highlights
- Total: 58 (as of 2026)
- Total recipients: 101 individuals (as of 2026)
- Website: nobelprize.org/prizes/economic-sciences/

The Nobel Memorial Prize in Economic Sciences, colloquially known as the Nobel Prize in Economics, is an award in the field of economic sciences administered by the Nobel Foundation. Officially, it is titled The Sveriges Riksbank Prize in Economic Sciences in Memory of Alfred Nobel (Swedish: Sveriges riksbanks pris i ekonomisk vetenskap till Alfred Nobels minne), established in 1968 by Sweden's central bank, Sveriges Riksbank, to celebrate its 300th anniversary and to honour Alfred Nobel.

Although the prize was not one of the original five Nobel Prizes established by Alfred Nobel's will, it is considered part of the Nobel Prize framework and is administered and referred to along with Nobel Prizes by the Nobel Foundation. Laureates of the Prize in economic sciences are chosen in a similar manner to and announced alongside the Nobel Prize recipients, and receive the Prize at the Nobel Prize award ceremony.

The laureates of the Prize in Economic Sciences are selected by the Royal Swedish Academy of Sciences, which also selects the laureates of the prizes in Physics and Chemistry. The Prize was first awarded in 1969 to Dutch economist Jan Tinbergen and Norwegian economist Ragnar Frisch "for having developed and applied dynamic models for the analysis of economic processes".

== Creation and funding ==
Since 1968 an endowment "in perpetuity" from Sveriges Riksbank has been paying the Nobel Foundation's administrative expenses associated with the award and funds the monetary component of the award. The amount of the Prize in Economic Sciences remains the same as other prizes, at 11 million Swedish kronor in 2023 and 2024. Since 2006, Sveriges Riksbank has given the Nobel Foundation an annual grant of 6.5 million Swedish kronor (in January 2008, approx. US$1 million; €0.7 million) for its administrative expenses associated with the award as well as 1 million Swedish kronor (until the end of 2008) to include information about the award on the Nobel Foundation's official websites.

=== Relation to the Nobel Prizes ===
The Prize in Economic Sciences is not one of the original five Nobel Prizes endowed by Alfred Nobel in his will. However, the nomination process, selection criteria, and awards presentation of the Prize in Economic Sciences are performed in a manner similar to that of the original Nobel Prizes.

Laureates are announced with the other Nobel Prize laureates, and receive the award at the same ceremony. The Royal Swedish Academy of Sciences awards the prize "in accordance with the rules governing the award of the Nobel Prizes instituted through his [Alfred Nobel's] will", which stipulate that the prize be awarded annually to "those who ... shall have conferred the greatest benefit on mankind".

== Award nomination and selection process ==
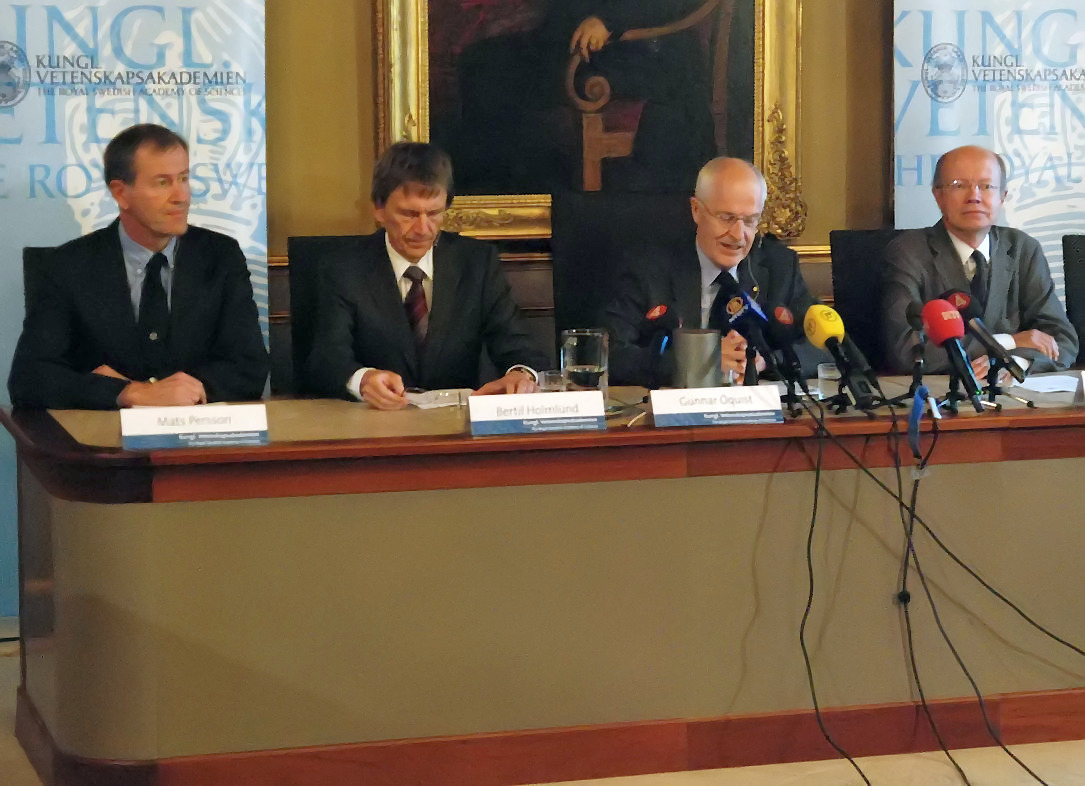
The Prize in Economic Sciences being announced at the Nobel Prize press conference by the Prize Committee in 2008

According to its official website, the Royal Swedish Academy of Sciences "administers a researcher exchange with academies in other countries and publishes six scientific journals. Every year the Academy awards the Nobel Prizes in Physics and in Chemistry, the Prize in Economic Sciences, the Crafoord Prize and a number of other large prizes".

Each September the Academy's Economics Prize Committee, which consists of five elected members, "sends invitations to thousands of scientists, members of academies and university professors in numerous countries, asking them to nominate candidates for the Prize in Economics for the coming year. Members of the Academy and former laureates are also authorised to nominate candidates." All proposals and their supporting evidence must be received before February 1. The proposals are reviewed by the Prize Committee and specially appointed experts. Before the end of September, the committee chooses potential laureates. If there is a tie, the chairman of the committee casts the deciding vote.

Members of the Royal Swedish Academy of Sciences vote in mid-October to determine the next laureate or laureates of the Prize in Economics. As with the Nobel Prizes, no more than three people can share the prize for a given year; they must still be living at the time of the Prize announcement in October; and information about nominations, including the names of nominees and nominators and related investigations and opinions, cannot be disclosed publicly or privately for 50 years.

Like the Nobel laureates in physics, chemistry, physiology or medicine, and literature, each laureate in Economics receives a diploma, gold medal, and monetary grant award document from the King of Sweden at the annual Nobel Prize Award Ceremony in Stockholm, on the anniversary of Nobel's death (December 10).

== Laureates ==
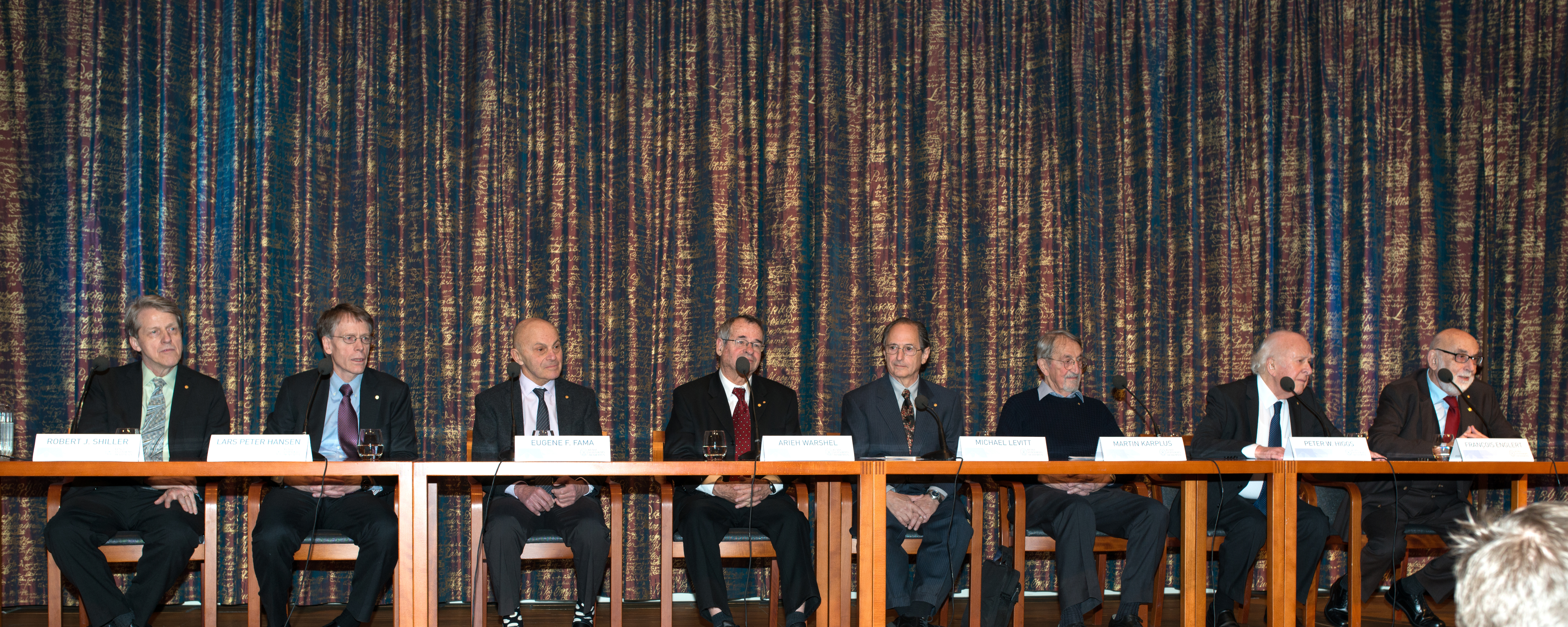
The Laureates of the Prize in economics, physics and chemistry appeared together at an event of the Royal Swedish Academy of Sciences in 2013.

The first prize in economics was awarded in 1969 to Ragnar Frisch and Jan Tinbergen "for having developed and applied dynamic models for the analysis of economic processes". Three women have received the prize: Elinor Ostrom, who won in 2009, Esther Duflo, who won in 2019, and Claudia Goldin, who won in 2023. Goldin was the first woman to win the award solo.

=== Awards to non-economists ===
In February 1995, following acrimony within the selection committee pertaining to the awarding of the 1994 Prize in Economics to John Forbes Nash, the Prize in Economics was redefined as a prize in social sciences. This made it available to researchers in such topics as political science, psychology, and sociology.

Moreover, the composition of the Economics Prize Committee changed to include two non-economists. This has not been confirmed by the Economics Prize Committee. The members of the 2007 Economics Prize Committee are still dominated by economists, as the secretary and four of the five members are professors of economics.

In 1978, Herbert A. Simon, whose PhD was in political science, became the first non-economist to win the prize, for his work in the fields of economics and organizational decision making. Elinor Ostrom and James Robinson, who are also political scientists, won the prize in 2009 and 2024, respectively. Similarly, Daniel Kahneman, a professor of psychology and public affairs at Princeton University, won the prize for work in the field of behavioral economics.

== Controversies and criticisms ==
=== Alleged misuse of the Nobel name ===
Critics argue that the prestige of the Prize in Economic Sciences derives in part from its association with the Nobel Prizes. Among them was Peter Nobel, a great-grandnephew of Alfred Nobel and a Swedish human rights lawyer. Nobel accuses the awarding institution of misusing his family's name, and states that no member of the Nobel family has ever had the intention of establishing a prize in economics. He explained that "Nobel despised people who cared more about profits than society's well-being", saying that "There is nothing to indicate that he would have wanted such a prize", and that the association with the Nobel prizes is "a PR coup by economists to improve their reputation".

=== Accusations of bias ===
Critics cite the apparent snub of Joan Robinson as evidence of the committee's bias towards mainstream economics.

=== Undue authority ===
In his speech at the 1974 Nobel Prize banquet, Friedrich Hayek stated that had he been consulted on the establishment of a Nobel Prize in economics, he would have "decidedly advised against it", primarily because "The Nobel Prize confers on an individual an authority which in economics no man ought to possess. This does not matter in the natural sciences. Here the influence exercised by an individual is chiefly an influence on his fellow experts; and they will soon cut him down to size if he exceeds his competence. But the influence of the economist that mainly matters is an influence over laymen: politicians, journalists, civil servants and the public generally." Nevertheless, Hayek accepted the award.

=== Controversial prizewinners ===
- Friedrich Hayek – according to Samuel Brittan of the Financial Times, both the former Swedish minister for finance, Kjell-Olof Feldt, and the former Swedish minister for commerce, Gunnar Myrdal, wanted the prize abolished, with "Myrdal rather less graciously want[ing] the prize abolished because it had been given to such reactionaries as Hayek (and afterwards Milton Friedman)." Relatedly, it has been noted that several members of the awarding committee have been affiliated with the Mont Pelerin Society.
- Milton Friedman – was awarded the 1976 prize in part for his work on monetarism. Awarding the prize to Friedman caused international protests. Friedman was accused of supporting the military dictatorship in Chile because of the relation of economists of the University of Chicago to Pinochet, and a controversial six-day trip he took to Chile during March 1975 (less than two years after the coup that ended with the suicide of its democratically elected President Salvador Allende). Friedman himself answered that he never was an adviser to the dictatorship, but only gave some lectures and seminars on inflation and met with officials, including Augusto Pinochet, in Chile. Four Nobel Prize laureates – George Wald, Linus Pauling, David Baltimore and Salvador Luria – wrote letters in October 1976 to The New York Times protesting Friedman's award.
- Robert Aumann – 2005 prize to Robert Aumann was criticized by the European press for his alleged use of game theory to justify his stance against the dismantling of illegal Israeli settlements in occupied Palestine.
- Eugene Fama and Robert Shiller at the same time – 2013 prize to Eugene Fama, Robert Shiller and Lars Peter Hansen "for their empirical analysis of asset prices" was seen as contradictory because Eugene Fama's work is in support of efficient-market hypothesis meanwhile Robert Shiller's work is against the efficient-market hypothesis focusing in investors' irrational behavior.

=== Expansion of the scope ===
The 1994 prize to mathematician John Forbes Nash caused controversy within the selection committee. This resulted in a change to the rules governing the committee during 1994: the prize's scope was redefined as one of social sciences, and Prize Committee members were limited to serve for three years.

== Alternative names ==
The prize's official name is the Sveriges Riksbank Prize in Economic Sciences in Memory of Alfred Nobel (Swedish: Sveriges riksbanks pris i ekonomisk vetenskap till Alfred Nobels minne). The prize has undergone many name changes due to controversy surrounding its status and nature:

Year(s)	English names
1969–1970	Prize in Economic Science dedicated to the memory of Alfred Nobel
1971	Prize in Economic Science
1972	Bank of Sweden Prize in Economic Sciences in Memory of Alfred Nobel
1973–1975	Prize in Economic Science in Memory of Alfred Nobel
1976–1977	Prize in Economic Sciences in Memory of Alfred Nobel
1978–1981	Alfred Nobel Memorial Prize in Economic Sciences
1982	Alfred Nobel Memorial Prize in Economic Science
1983	Prize in Economic Sciences in Memory of Alfred Nobel
1984–1990	Alfred Nobel Memorial Prize in Economic Sciences
1991	Sveriges Riksbank (Bank of Sweden) Prize in Economic Sciences in Memory of Alfred Nobel
1992–2005	Bank of Sweden Prize in Economic Sciences in Memory of Alfred Nobel
2006–present	The Sveriges Riksbank Prize in Economic Sciences in Memory of Alfred Nobel

== See also ==
- List of economics awards
- List of Nobel laureates by country
- List of prizes known as the Nobel of a field
- List of prizes named after people

== General and cited references ==
- Nasar, Sylvia (1998). A Beautiful Mind. New York: Simon & Schuster. ISBN 0-684-81906-6.
