= Peter Englund (economist) =

Swedish economist (born 1950)

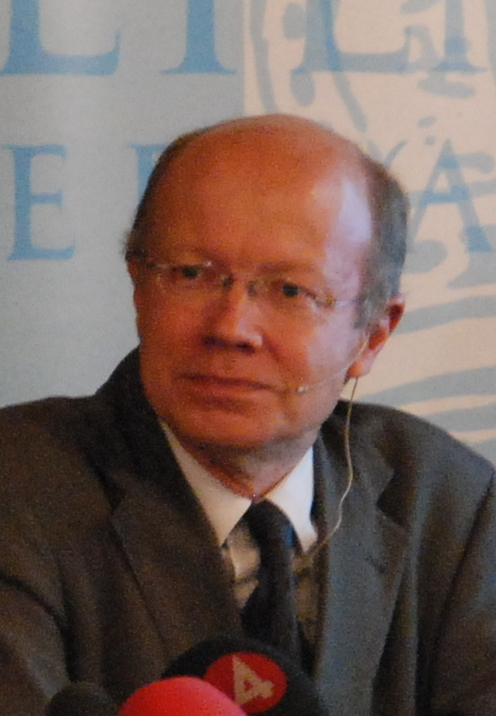
- Born: 4 February 1950 (age 76); Stockholm, Sweden

Academic work
- Discipline: economics
- Institutions: Uppsala University; Stockholm School of Economics

Peter Englund (born 4 February 1950, Stockholm), is a Swedish economist. He was professor at Uppsala University 1988-1998 and is professor at the Stockholm School of Economics since 1998.

Englund is a member of the Royal Swedish Academy of Engineering Sciences since 1997, and is a member of the Committee for the Prize in Economic Sciences in Memory of Alfred Nobel, the so-called "Nobel Prize in Economics". Using mostly well-developed approaches, he researched causal links pertaining to constitution of office space pricing.
