= Investment-specific technological progress =

Investment in new equipment

Investment-specific technological progress or Investment-specific technological change refers to progress that requires investment in new equipment and structures embodying the latest technology in order to realize its benefits. To model the influence of technological change upon production the influence of a technological change upon the specific inputs (i.e. labor and capital) of a production model is assessed in terms of the resulting effect upon the final good of the model (i.e. goods and services).

To realize the benefits of such technological change for production a firm must invest to attain the new technology as a component of production. For example, the advent of the microchip (an important technological improvement in computers) will affect the production of Ford cars only if Ford Motor Co.'s assembly plants invest in computers with microchips (instead of computers with punched cards) and use them in the production of a product, i.e. Mustangs. Investment-specific technological progress requires investing in new production inputs which contain or embody the latest technology. A firm has to buy the new technology to reap its benefits, and invest in training its workers and managers in order to use this new technology.

== Significance ==
Identifying investment-specific technological progress within an economy will determine how an individual behaves in reaction to new technology, i.e. whether the individual will invest their savings. If "investment-specific" technological change is the main source of progress in an industry, then an individual would invest in firms to purchase and develop new capital, because technological improvements result in improvements to the goods available to consume. Firms may also choose to train current employees in the new technology or subsidize the education of new employees in the operation of the new technology. As such technological progress has an impact upon the labor market.

Technological progress has direct positive impacts upon human welfare. As a result of new technologies, producers can make a greater volume of product at a lower cost. The resulting reduction in prices benefits the consumer, who can purchase more. Women have been able to join the labor market in greater numbers and become less economically dependent on men. Further impacts include a reduction in child labor starting around 1900.

Figure 1

An example of investment-specific technological progress is the microwave oven. The first microwave oven cost between US$2000 and US$3000 and was housed in refrigerator-sized cabinets. Microwave ovens are now small compact units. Many industries have adopted the microwave through capital or research investment. Applications outside the food industry include the iron and steel industry as a heating tool and the chemical industry as a tool for organic synthesis.

== Measurement ==
There is no quantitative measure of technological progress, so direct relationships between technological progress and recordable values are used. "'Investment-specific'" technological progress makes it easier to produce goods. As a result, the price of the goods decreases. In particular, "investment-specific" technological advance has affected the prices of two inputs into the production process: equipment and structures. If there is technological progress in the production of these goods, then it is expected the price will fall or the value of the good will rise relative to older versions of the same good.

Figure 2 (the pink line) shows how the price of new producer durables (such as equipment) in the United States relative to the price of new consumer nondurables has consistently declined over the past fifty years. To calculate the relative price of producer durables, divide the price that firms pay (for the durable inputs of production) by the price that a consumer of the firms product pays. Relative prices are used to represent how many units of equipment can be bought in terms of the a single unit of consumer goods. As a result of technological development, firms have been able to buy comparatively more units of equipment for each unit of consumption. The quality of the goods increases while the cost of production decreases. When changes in quality are not taken into account, the apparent price of equipment undergoes a smaller reduction (see the black line in Figure 2).

Figure 2

One approach to measuring the price of technologically improved structures is to assign a higher value to newer buildings due to the embodyment of the new technology in their design. In this approach, these buildings would have a higher rent, i.e. renting a square foot in a new building would be more expensive than renting a square foot in a building forty years old.

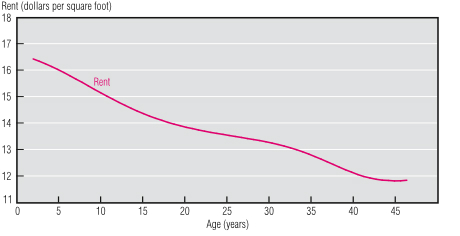
Figure 3

Figures 2 and 3 suggest that investment-specific technological change is operating in the US. The annual rate of technological progress in equipment and structures has been estimated to be about 3.2% and 1%, respectively.

== Relationship to capital-augmenting technical change ==
Investment-specific technological change (ISTC) is closely related to capital-augmenting technical change (KATC), which models improvements in the productivity of capital directly through the aggregate production function. Both ISTC and narrowly defined KATC — the latter referring to KATC appearing in the production function rather than in the capital accumulation equation — are ways of representing the same underlying empirical phenomenon: the secular decline in the price of capital goods relative to consumption goods, as documented by the Federal Reserve Bank of St. Louis (FRED).

In a model that includes both ISTC and narrowly defined KATC, Grossman, Helpman, Oberfield, and Sampson (2017) show that only the product of the two matters for balanced growth. Casey and Horii (2024) show further that the two are equivalent up to a normalization of the unit of capital: if capital is measured so that one unit of output converts to one unit of capital, ISTC disappears and its effect is fully absorbed into KATC in the production function. The choice between modeling the falling relative price of capital as ISTC or as narrowly defined KATC is therefore a matter of representation rather than substance. uzawa's theorem discusses the implications of this relationship for balanced growth theory.
