= Norman Lloyd Johnson =

American mathematician

- Born: 9 January 1917; Ilford, Essex, England
- Died: 18 November 2004 (aged 87); Chapel Hill, North Carolina, United States
- Education: University of London
- Scientific career
- Fields: Statistics
- Workplaces: University of North Carolina at Chapel Hill
- Doctoral advisor: Egon Pearson
- Doctoral students: D. J. Bartholomew; Gwilym Jenkins; S. Lynne Stokes

Norman Lloyd Johnson (9 January 1917 – 18 November 2004) was a professor of statistics and author or editor of several standard reference works in statistics and probability theory.

== Education ==
Johnson attended Ilford County High School, and went on to University College London, where he obtained a B.Sc. in mathematics 1936 and a B.Sc. and M.Sc. in statistics in 1937 and 1938.

== Career ==
On qualification in 1938, Johnson was appointed Assistant Lecturer in the Department of Statistics at UCL. During World War II, he served under his former Professor Egon Pearson as an Experimental Officer with the Ordnance Board. He returned to the Statistics Department at UCL in 1945 and stayed there until 1962, as Assistant Lecturer, Lecturer and then Reader. In 1948 he was awarded a Ph.D. in Statistics for his work on the Johnson system of frequency curves. In 1949 he became a Fellow of the Institute of Actuaries.

Two visiting appointments in the USA, at the University of North Carolina at Chapel Hill (UNC) in 1952–1953 and at Case Institute of Technology in Cleveland, Ohio, in 1960–1961, led to his permanent appointment as Professor in the Department of Statistics at UNC in 1962. He was Chairman 1971–1976 and officially retired in 1982, but continued to be active in scholarship and research as Professor Emeritus almost until his death. UNC named a distinguished endowed chair in his honour. He expressed a wish to retire completely and return to live in Ilford, but never managed it.

== Publications ==
He wrote, together with Samuel Kotz, a standard reference series, Distributions in Statistics. This series has been described as of "virtually Biblical authority", a comment that he (a devout Christian) firmly rejected. He was editor-in-chief of the 10-volume Encyclopedia of Statistical Sciences, widely regarded as one of the most important reference works in statistical methodology. He also wrote several textbooks and about 180 papers. His book "Survival Models" was co-authored with his wife Regina Elandt Johnson, herself a professor of biostatistics.

== Honours ==
He was honoured in numerous ways, including the Wilks Award of the American Statistical Association, the Shewhart Medal of the American Society for Quality Control and a D.Sc. degree from UCL.
