= Hukukane Nikaido =

Japanese economist (1923–2001)

- Born: June 28, 1923; Tokyo Prefecture, Japan
- Died: August 23, 2001 (aged 78)

Academic background
- Education: University of Tokyo (D.Sc. 1961); University of Tokyo (B.S. 1949)

Academic work
- Discipline: Mathematical economics
- Awards: Order of the Rising Sun, 3rd class. (2000)

Hukukane Nikaido (二階堂副包, Nikaidô Fukukane; June 28, 1923 – August 23, 2001) was a Japanese economist.

== Career ==
He received a B.S. in mathematics from the University of Tokyo and a D.Sc. in mathematics from the University of Tokyo in 1961.

== Honors ==
- 1962, Fellow, Econometric Society.
- 2000, Order of the Rising Sun, 3rd class.

== Published works ==
=== Books ===
- Nikaido, Hukukane (1968). Convex Structures and Economic Theory. Mathematics in Science and Engineering. Vol. 51. New York: Academic Press. ISBN 1483253287.
- Nikaido, Hukukane (1970). Introduction to sets and mappings in modern economics. Amsterdam: North-Holland Pub. Co. ISBN 0720430437.
- Nikaido, Hukukane (1975). Monopolistic Competition and Effective Demand. Princeton Studies in Mathematical Economics. Vol. 6. Princeton, New Jersey: Princeton University Press. ISBN 9780691644899.
- Nikaido, Hukukane (1996). Prices, Cycles, and Growth. Studies in Dynamical Economic Science. Cambridge, Massachusetts: MIT Press. ISBN 0262517183.

=== Journal articles ===
- Nikaidô, Hukukane (1954). "Note on the General Economic Equilibrium for Nonlinear Production Functions". Econometrica. 22 (1): 49–53. doi:10.2307/1909831. JSTOR 1909831.
- Nikaidô, Hukukane (1954). "On von Neumann's minimax theorem". Pacific Journal of Mathematics. 4 (1): 65–72. doi:10.2140/pjm.1954.4.65.
- Nikaidô, Hukukane; Isoda, Kazuo (1955). "Note on non-cooperative convex games" (PDF). Pacific Journal of Mathematics. 5 (5): 807–815. doi:10.2140/pjm.1955.5.807.
- Nikaidô, Hukukane (1956). "On the Classical Multilateral Exchange Problem". Metroeconomica. 8 (2): 135–145. doi:10.1111/j.1467-999X.1956.tb00099.x.
- Nikaidô, Hukukane (1959). "Stability of Equilibrium by the Brown-von Neumann Differential Equation". Econometrica. 27 (4): 654–671. doi:10.2307/1909356. JSTOR 1909356.
- Nikaidô, Hukukane; Uzawa, Hirofumi (1960). "Stability and Non-Negativity in a Walrasian Tâtonnement Process". International Economic Review. 1 (1): 50–59. doi:10.2307/2525408. JSTOR 2525408.
- Nikaidô, Hukukane (1962). "Some Dynamic Phenomena in the Leontief Model of Reversely Lagged Type". Review of Economic Studies. 29 (4): 313–323. doi:10.2307/2296307. JSTOR 2296307.
- Nikaidô, Hukukane (1964). "Persistence of Continual Growth Near the von Neumann Ray: A Strong Version of the Radner Turnpike Theorem". Econometrica. 32 (1–2): 151–162. doi:10.2307/1913740. JSTOR 1913740.
- Gale, David; Nikaidô, Hukukane (1965). "The Jacobian matrix and global univalence of mappings". Mathematische Annalen. 159 (2): 81–93. doi:10.1007/BF01360282. S2CID 7144184.
