= Joichi Suetsuna =

Japanese mathematician

Joichi Suetsuna (Japanese: 末綱 恕一 Suetsuna Joichi; alternative Romanziation: Zyoiti Suetuna; November 28, 1898 – August 6, 1970) was a Japanese mathematician who worked mainly on number theory. In addition to working in Japan, where he held a chair at Tokyo University and was eventually selected to the Japan Academy, Suetsuna also spent time studying in Europe and introduced to Japan research styles he witnessed there. Later in life, especially after World War II, he studied Buddhist philosophy.

He was a teacher of Hirofumi Uzawa.
