= Zvi Hercowitz =

Israeli economist and academic

Zvi Hercowitz (Hebrew: צבי הרקוביץ; born December 21, 1945, in Rosario, Argentina) is professor emeritus at Tel Aviv University's School of Economics and has been a member of the monetary committee of the Bank of Israel from 2017 to 2025.

He emigrated to Israel in 1966 and began his academic career at Tel Aviv University in 1980. He published extensively throughout his career, with notable works includingMoney and the Dispersion of Relative Prices", Journal of Political Economy, April 1981; "Output Growth, the Real Wage, and Employment Fluctuations" with Michael Sampson, American Economic Review, December 1991; and "Long-Run Implications of Investment-Specific Technological Progress" with Jeremy Greenwood and Per Krusell, American Economic Review, June 1997.

He received the bachelor's degree in economics in 1973 and the master of arts in economics in 1975, both from the Hebrew University in Jerusalem. In 1980 he received his PhD in economics from the University of Rochester with his dissertation supervised by Robert Barro.
