= Samuel Kotz =

American statistician and engineer (1930–2010)

- שמואל קוץ
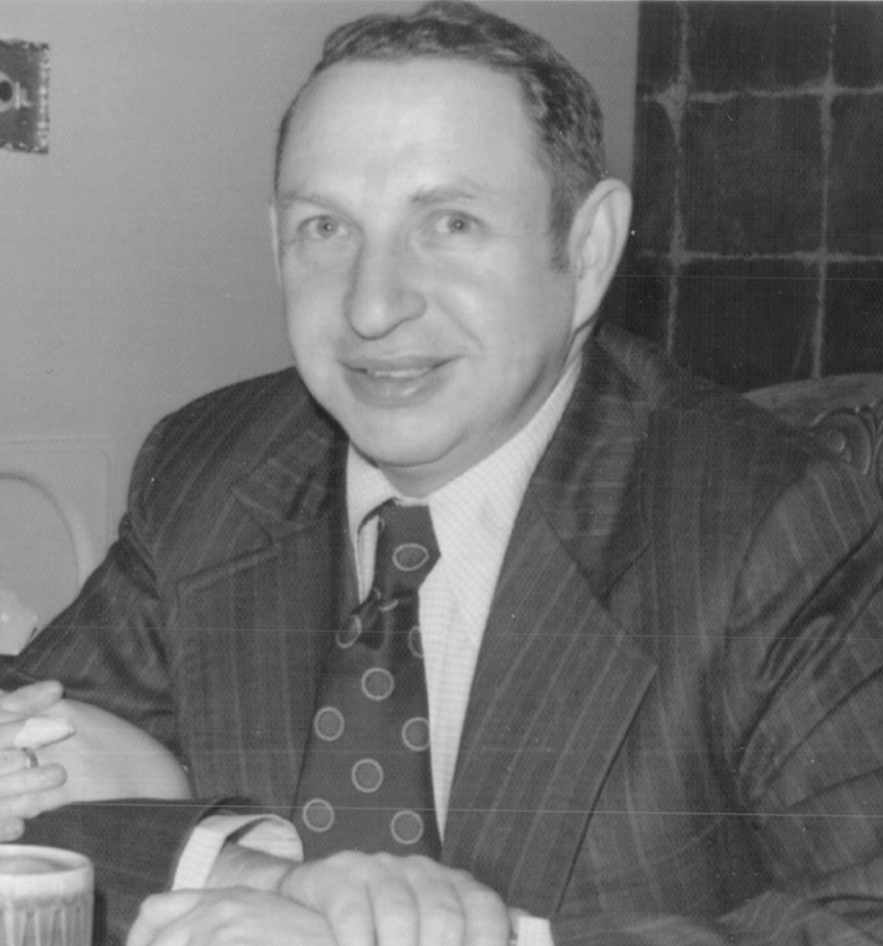
- Kotz in 1976
- Born: Samuel Kotz; August 30, 1930; Harbin, China
- Died: March 16, 2010 (aged 79); Kemp Mill, Maryland
- Occupations: Author, Professor, Research Scholar
- Notable work: Continuous Univariate Distributions (1970); Multivariate T-Distributions and Their Applications (2004); Continuous Multivariate Distributions, Volume 1: Models and Applications (2004)

Samuel Kotz (Hebrew: שמואל קוץ; August 30, 1930, Harbin, China – March 16, 2010, Kemp Mill, Maryland) was a professor and research scholar in the Department of Engineering Management and Systems Engineering, School of Engineering and Applied Science at The George Washington University from 1997 until his death on March 16, 2010. He was an author or editor of several standard reference works in statistics and probability theory.

== Early life ==
Kotz was born in Harbin, China, to a Jewish family who had left Russia following the Russian Revolution. He moved to Israel in 1949, serving in the Israeli Air Force. Kotz immigrated to the United States in the 1950s and become an American citizen in the 1970s.

== Education and career ==
Kotz studied electrical engineering at the Harbin Institute of Technology, graduating with honors in 1946. He obtained an M.A. with honors in mathematics in 1956 from the Hebrew University in Jerusalem. He obtained a PhD degree in Mathematical Statistics from Cornell University.

In 1964, Kotz joined the University of Toronto as associate professor. He then moved to Temple University, Philadelphia, as a professor of mathematics in 1967 and the University of Maryland, College Park, as a professor in the College of Business and Management in 1979. In 1997 he joined the Operations Research Department at George Washington University. His visiting positions included Bowling Green State University, Bucknell University, Harbin Institute of Technology, Luleå University of Technology, Tel Aviv University, and University of Guelph.

== Honors and awards ==
Kotz was awarded honorary doctorates from Harbin Institute of Technology in 1982, University of Athens in 1995 and Bowling Green State University in 1997. He was a fellow of the American Statistical Association, fellow of the Institute of Mathematical Statistics, fellow of the Royal Statistical Society and elected member of the International Statistical Institute.

- Awarded by the Washington Academy of Sciences in 1998

== Family ==
Kotz married Raysel Greenwald in 1962. They had their first child, Tamar Kotz, in 1965. Followed by Harold David Kotz in 1966 and Pnina Kotz in 1973. His first two children were born in Toronto, but moved to Philadelphia in 1967.

== Publications ==
He and Norman L. Johnson founded the Encyclopedia of Statistical Sciences (1982–1999), of which he was editor-in-chief. He was also a co-author of the four-volume Compendium on Statistical Distributions (First Edition 1969–1972, Second Edition 1993–1997). Over the course of his career he authored or co-authored a total of three Russian-English scientific dictionaries, over three dozen volumes/books/monographs in the field of statistics and quality control and over 280 papers.

=== Books ===
- Kotz, Samuel (1966). Russian-English dictionary and reader in the cybernetical sciences, with a selected bibliography of Soviet publications in the cybernetical sciences (in English and Russian). Internet Archive. New York, Academic Press.
- Kotz, Samuel (1971). Russian-English, English-Russian glossary of statistical terms;. Maurice G. Kendall. Edinburgh: Oliver and Boyd for the International Statistical Institute. ISBN 0-05-002446-9. OCLC 553936.
- Maĭstrov, L. E.; Kotz, Samuel (1974). Probability theory; a historical sketch. New York: Academic Press. ISBN 0-12-465750-8. OCLC 722855.
- Johnson, Norman Lloyd; Kotz, Samuel (1977). Urn models and their application : an approach to modern discrete probability theory. New York: Wiley. ISBN 0-471-44630-0. OCLC 2968014.
- Galambos, János; Kotz, Samuel (1978). Characterizations of probability distributions : a unified approach with an emphasis on exponential and related models. Berlin: Springer-Verlag. ISBN 0-387-08933-0. OCLC 4194743.
- Kotz, Samuel; Stroup, Donna F. (1983). Educated guessing : how to cope in an uncertain world. New York: M. Dekker. ISBN 0-8247-7000-5. OCLC 9442504.
- Johnson, Norman Lloyd; Kotz, Samuel; Wu, Xizhi (1991). Inspection errors for attributes in quality control (1st ed.). London: Chapman & Hall. ISBN 0-412-38770-0. OCLC 24011425.
- Kotz, Samuel; Johnson, Norman Lloyd, eds. (1992). Breakthroughs in statistics. New York: Springer-Verlag. ISBN 0-387-97566-7. OCLC 24213036.
- Kotz, Samuel; Johnson, Norman Lloyd (1993). Process capability indices. Boca Raton. ISBN 978-0-367-44989-6. OCLC 1129879631.
- Johnson, Norman Lloyd; Kotz, Samuel, eds. (1997). Leading personalities in statistical sciences : from the 17th century to the present. New York: Wiley. ISBN 0-471-16381-3. OCLC 36430730.
- Kotz, Samuel; Nadarajah, Saralees (2000). Extreme value distributions : theory and applications. Saralees Nadarajah. London: Imperial College Press. ISBN 1-86094-402-7. OCLC 52859163.
- Mari, Dominique Drouet; Kotz, Samuel (2001). Correlation and dependence. London: Imperial College Press. ISBN 978-1-86094-975-3. OCLC 262610199.
- Kotz, Samuel (2001). The Laplace distribution and generalizations : a revisit with applications to communications, economics, engineering, and finance. Tomasz J. Kozubowski, Krzysztof Podgórski. Boston: Birkhäuser. ISBN 0-8176-4166-1. OCLC 45583491.
- Kleiber, Christian; Kotz, Samuel (2003). Statistical size distributions in economics and actuarial sciences. Hoboken, NJ: Wiley. ISBN 0-471-45716-7. OCLC 53121718.
- Kotz, Samuel; Lumelskii, Yan Petrovich; Pensky, Marianna (2003). The stress-strength model and its generalizations : theory and applications. River Edge, NJ: World Scientific. ISBN 981-256-451-9. OCLC 60716240.
- Kotz, Samuel (2004). Beyond beta : other continuous families of distributions with bounded support and applications. Johan René. Van Dorp. Singapore: World Scientific. ISBN 981-270-128-1. OCLC 232159983.
- Kotz, Samuel; Nadarajah, Saralees (2004). Linear combinations, ratios, and products of distributions with applications. Boca Raton, Fla.: Chapman & Hall/CRC. ISBN 1-58488-403-7. OCLC 56453946.
- Kotz, Samuel; Nadarajah, Saralees (2004). Multivariate t distributions and their applications. Cambridge: Cambridge University Press. ISBN 0-521-82654-3. OCLC 52541944.
- Dale, Andrew I.; Kotz, Samuel (2011). Arthur L Bowley : a Pioneer in Modern Statistics and Economics. Singapore: World Scientific. ISBN 978-981-283-551-2. OCLC 755591761.

== See also ==
- Saralees Nadarajah (2004) A Conversation with Samuel Kotz, Statistical Science, 17, 2, 220–233. A conversation with Samuel Kotz
