= Annals of the Institute of Statistical Mathematics =

- Discipline: Statistics
- Language: English
- Edited by: Yoshiyuki Ninomiya

Publication details
- History: 1949–present
- Publisher: Springer Science+Business Media on behalf of the Institute of Statistical Mathematics
- Frequency: Bimonthly
- Open access: Hybrid
- Impact factor: 1.267 (2020)

Standard abbreviations
- ISO 4: Ann. Inst. Stat. Math.
- MathSciNet: Ann. Inst. Statist. Math.

Indexing
- CODEN: AISXAD
- ISSN: 0020-3157 (print); 1572-9052 (web)
- LCCN: 60018576
- OCLC no.: 41554827

Links
- Journal homepage; Online archive

Annals of the Institute of Statistical Mathematics (AISM) is a bimonthly peer-reviewed scientific journal covering statistics. It was established in 1949 and is published by Springer Science+Business Media on behalf of Institute of Statistical Mathematics. The editor-in-chief is Yoshiyuki Ninomiya (Institute of Statistical Mathematics). According to the Journal Citation Reports, the journal has a 2020 impact factor of 1.267.
