= Population growth =

Increase in the number of individuals in a population

External videos
- Food Production and Population Growth - Daniel Quinn

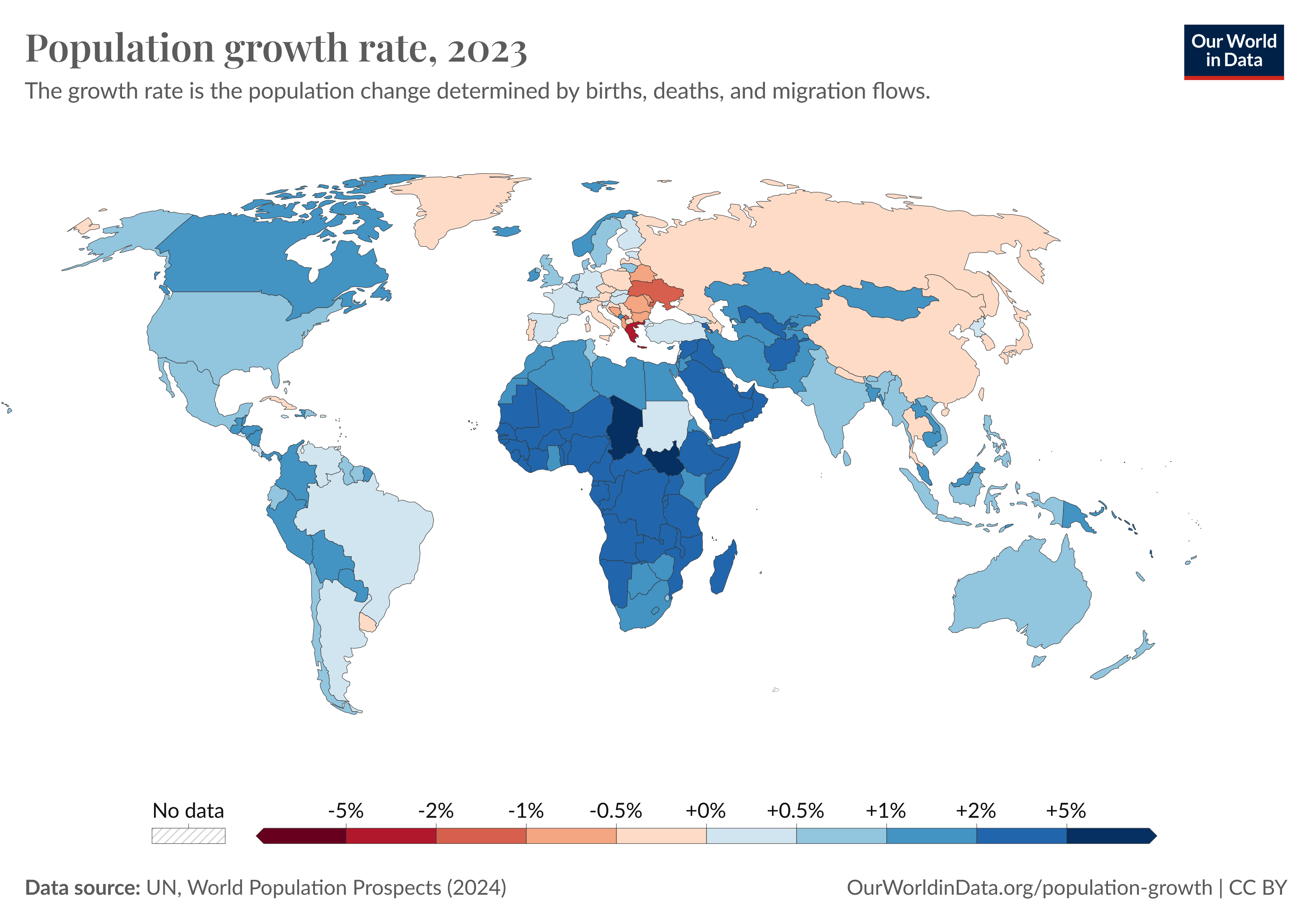
Population growth rate (2023, Our World in Data)

Absolute increase in global human population per year

Population growth is the increase in the number of people in a population or dispersed group. The global population has grown from 1 billion in 1800 to 8.3 billion in 2026. Actual global human population growth amounts to around 70 million annually, or 0.84% per year. As of 2024, The United Nations projects that global population will peak in the mid-2080s at around 10.3 billion. The UN's estimates have decreased strongly in recent years due to sharp declines in global birth rates. Others have challenged many recent population projections as having underestimated population growth.

The world human population has been growing since the end of the Black Death, around the year 1350. A mix of technological advancement that improved agricultural productivity and sanitation and medical advancement that reduced mortality increased population growth. In some geographies, this has slowed through the process called the demographic transition, where many nations with high standards of living have seen a significant slowing of population growth. This is in direct contrast with less developed contexts, where population growth is still happening. Globally, the rate of population growth has declined from a peak of 2.2% per year in 1963.

Population growth alongside increased consumption is a driver of environmental concerns, such as biodiversity loss and climate change, due to overexploitation of natural resources for human development. Hence, population reduction is discussed as a sustainability strategy, though its potential is limited to allow free individual life choices. International policy focused on mitigating the impact of human population growth is concentrated in the Sustainable Development Goals which seeks to improve the standard of living globally while reducing the impact of society on the environment while advancing human well-being.

Population
Years passed	Year	Pop. (billions)
–	1800	1
127	1927	2
33	1960	3
14	1974	4
13	1987	5
12	1999	6
12	2011	7
11	2022	8
12	2035*	9
20	2055*	10
35	2088*	11
*World Population Prospects 2017 (United Nations Population Division)

== History ==
World human population estimates from 1800 to 2100, with estimated range of future population after 2020 based on "high" and "low" scenarios. Data from the United Nations projections in 2019.

Estimated size of human population from 10,000 BCE to 2000 CE

World population has been rising continuously since the end of the Black Death, around the year 1350. Population began growing rapidly in the Western world during the industrial revolution. The most significant increase in the world's population has been since the 1950s, mainly due to medical advancements and increases in agricultural productivity.

=== Haber process ===
Due to its dramatic impact on the human ability to grow food, the Haber process, named after one of its inventors, the German chemist Fritz Haber, served as the "detonator of the population explosion", enabling the global population to increase from 1.6 billion in 1900 to 7.7 billion by November 2019.

=== Thomas McKeown hypotheses ===
Some of the reasons for the "Modern Rise of Population" were particularly investigated by the British health scientist Thomas McKeown (1912–1988). In his publications, McKeown challenged four theories about the population growth:

1. McKeown stated that the growth in Western population, particularly surging in the 19th century, was not so much caused by an increase in fertility, but largely by a decline of mortality particularly of childhood mortality followed by infant mortality,
2. The decline of mortality could largely be attributed to rising standards of living, whereby McKeown put most emphasis on improved nutritional status,
3. McKeown questioned the effectiveness of public health measures, including sanitary reforms, vaccination and quarantine,
4. The "McKeown thesis" states that curative medicine measures played little role in mortality decline, not only prior to the mid-20th century but also until well into the 20th century.

Although the McKeown thesis has been heavily disputed, recent studies have confirmed the value of his ideas. His work is pivotal for present day thinking about population growth, birth control, public health and medical care. McKeown had a major influence on many population researchers, such as health economists and Nobel prize winners Robert W. Fogel (1993) and Angus Deaton (2015). The latter considered McKeown as "the founder of social medicine".

== Growth rate models ==
The "population growth rate" is the rate at which the number of individuals in a population increases in a given time period, expressed as a fraction of the initial population. Specifically, population growth rate refers to the change in population over a unit time period, often expressed as a percentage of the number of individuals in the population at the beginning of that period. This can be written as the formula, valid for a sufficiently small time interval:

$$\text{Population growth rate} = \frac{ P(t_2)  -  P(t_1)} {P(t_1)(t_2-t_1)}$$

A positive growth rate indicates that the population is increasing, while a negative growth rate indicates that the population is decreasing. A growth ratio of zero indicates that there were the same number of individuals at the beginning and end of the period—a growth rate may be zero even when there are significant changes in the birth rates, death rates, immigration rates, and age distribution between the two times.

A related measure is the net reproduction rate. In the absence of migration, a net reproduction rate of more than 1 indicates that the population of females is increasing, while a net reproduction rate less than one (sub-replacement fertility) indicates that the population of females is decreasing.

Most non-human populations do not grow exponentially, rather they follow a logistic model. Once the population has reached its carrying capacity, it will stabilize and the exponential curve will level off towards the carrying capacity, which is usually when a population has depleted most its natural resources. In the world human population, growth may be said to have been following a linear trend throughout the last few decades.

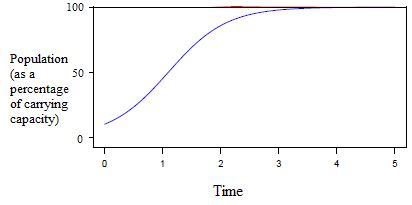
The logistic growth of a population

=== Logistic equation ===
The growth of a population can often be modelled by the logistic equation

$$\frac{dP}{dt}=rP\left(1-\frac{P}{K}\right),$$

where

- $P(t)$ = the population after time t;
- $t$ = time a population grows;
- $r$ = the relative growth rate coefficient;
- $K$ = the carrying capacity of the population; defined by ecologists as the maximum population size that a particular environment can sustain.

As it is a separable differential equation, the population may be solved explicitly, producing a logistic function:

$$P(t)=\frac{K}{1+Ae^{-rt}}$$,

where $A=\frac{K-P_0}{P_0}$ and $P_0$ is the initial population at time 0.

== Global population growth rate ==
A world map showing global variations in fertility rate per woman according to the CIA World Factbook's 2021 data: 6–7 children 5–6 children 4–5 children / 3–4 children 2–3 children 1–2 children

Estimates of population evolution in different continents between 1950 and 2050 according to the United Nations. The vertical axis is logarithmic and is in millions of people. (2011)

World population growth rates between 1950 and 2050

The world population growth rate peaked in 1963 at 2.2% per year and subsequently declined. In 2017, the estimated annual growth rate was 1.1%. The CIA World Factbook gives the world annual birthrate, mortality rate, and growth rate as 1.86%, 0.78%, and 1.08% respectively. The last 100 years have seen a massive fourfold increase in the population, due to medical advances, lower mortality rates, and an increase in agricultural productivity made possible by the Green Revolution.

The annual increase in the number of living humans peaked at 88.0 million in 1989, then slowly reduced to 73.9 million in 2003, after which it rose again to 75.2 million in 2006. In 2017, the human population increased by 83 million. Generally, developed nations have seen a decline in their growth rates in recent decades, though annual growth rates remain above 2% in some countries of the Middle East and Sub-Saharan Africa, and also in South Asia, Southeast Asia, and Latin America.

In some countries the population is declining, especially in Eastern Europe, mainly due to low fertility rates, high death rates and emigration. In Southern Africa, growth is slowing due to the high number of AIDS-related deaths. Some Western Europe countries might also experience population decline. Japan's population began decreasing in 2005.

The United Nations Population Division projects world population to reach 11.2 billion by the end of the 21st century. The Institute for Health Metrics and Evaluation projects that the global population will peak in 2064 at 9.73 billion and decline to 8.89 billion in 2100. A 2014 study in Science concludes that the global population will reach 11 billion by 2100, with a 70% chance of continued growth into the 22nd century. The German Foundation for World Population reported in December 2019 that the global human population grows by 2.6 people every second, and could reach 8 billion by 2023.

== Growth by country ==
The majority of world population growth today is occurring in less developed countries.

According to United Nations population statistics, the world population grew by 30%, or 1.6 billion humans, between 1990 and 2010. In number of people the increase was highest in India (350 million) and China (196 million). Population growth rate was among highest in the United Arab Emirates (315%) and Qatar (271%).

Growth rates of the world's most populous countries
Rank	Country	Population			Annual Growth (%)	
Rank	Country	1990	2010	2020 (est.)	1990–2010	2010–2020
	World	5,306,425,000	6,895,889,000	7,503,828,180	1.3%	0.8%
1	China	1,139,060,000	1,341,335,000	1,384,688,986	0.8%	0.3%
2	India	873,785,000	1,224,614,000	1,333,000,000	1.7%	0.9%
3	United States	253,339,000	310,384,000	329,256,465	1.0%	0.6%
4	Indonesia	184,346,000	239,871,000	262,787,403	1.3%	0.9%
5	Brazil	149,650,000	194,946,000	208,846,892	1.3%	0.7%
6	Pakistan	111,845,000	173,593,000	207,862,518	2.2%	1.8%
7	Nigeria	97,552,000	158,423,000	203,452,505	2.5%	2.5%
8	Bangladesh	105,256,000	148,692,000	159,453,001	1.7%	0.7%
9	Russia	148,244,000	142,958,000	142,122,776	−0.2%	−0.1%
10	Japan	122,251,000	128,057,000	126,168,156	0.2%	−0.1%

Many of the world's countries, including many in Sub-Saharan Africa, the Middle East, South Asia and South East Asia, have seen a sharp rise in population since the end of the Cold War. The fear is that high population numbers are putting further strain on natural resources, food supplies, fuel supplies, employment, housing, etc. in some of the less fortunate countries. For example, the population of Chad has ultimately grown from 6,279,921 in 1993 to 10,329,208 in 2009, further straining its resources. Vietnam, Mexico, Nigeria, Egypt, Ethiopia, and the DRC are witnessing a similar growth in population.

The following table gives some example countries or territories:

Country/territory	Population in					Life expectancy in years (2008)	Total population growth from 1960s to 2007–2011
Country/territory	1967	1990	1994	2002	2008	Life expectancy in years (2008)	Total population growth from 1960s to 2007–2011
Eritrea*	N/A*	N/A*	3,437,000	4,298,269	5,673,520	61	2,236,520
Ethiopia*	23,457,000*	50,974,000*	54,939,000	67,673,031(2003)	79,221,000	55	55,764,000
Sudan	14,355,000†	25,204,000†	27,361,000†	38,114,160 (2003)†	42,272,000†	50†	27,917,000
Chad	3,410,000	5,679,000	6,183,000	9,253,493(2003)	10,329,208 (2009)	47	6,919,205
Niger	3,546,000	7,732,000	8,846,000	10,790,352 (2001)	15,306,252 (2009)	44	11,760,252
Nigeria	61,450,000	88,500,000	108,467,000	129,934,911	158,259,000	47	96,809,000
Mali	4,745,000	8,156,000	10,462,000	11,340,480	14,517,176(2010)	50	9,772,176
Mauritania	1,050,000	2,025,000	2,211,000	2,667,859 (2003)	3,291,000 (2009)	54	2,241,000
Senegal	3,607,000	7,327,000	8,102,000	9,967,215	13,711,597 (2009)	57	10,104,597
(The Gambia) Gambia	343,000	861,000	1,081,000	1,367,124 (2000)	1,705,000	55	1,362,000
Algeria	11,833,126	25,012,000	27,325,000	32,818,500 (2003)	34,895,000	74	23,061,874
(Democratic Republic of the Congo) The DRC/Zaire	16,353,000	35,562,000	42,552,000	55,225,478 (2003)	70,916,439	54	54,563,439
Egypt	30,083,419	53,153,000	58,326,000	70,712,345 (2003)	79,089,650	72	49,006,231
Réunion (overseas region of France)	418,000	N/A	N/A	720,934 (2003)	827,000 (2009)	N/A	409,000
Falkland Islands (British Overseas Territory)	2,500	N/A	N/A	2,967 (2003)	3,140(2010)	N/A	640
Chile	8,935,500	13,173,000	13,994,000	15,116,435	17,224,200 (2011)	77	8,288,700
Colombia	19,191,000	32,987,000	34,520,000	41,088,227	45,925,397 (2010)	73	26,734,397
Brazil	85,655,000	150,368,000	153,725,000	174,468,575 (2000)	190,732,694 (2010)	72	105,077,694
Mexico	45,671,000	86,154,000	93,008,000	103,400,165 (2000)	112,322,757 (2010)	76	66,651,757
Fiji	476,727 (1966)	765,000	771,000	844,330 (2001)	849,000 (2010)	70	372,273
Nauru	6,050	10,000	N/A	12,329	9,322 (2011)	N/A	3,272
Jamaica	1,876,000	2,420,000	2,429,000	2,695,867 (2003)	2,847,232(2010)	74	971,232
Australia	11,540,764	17,086,000	17,843,000	19,546,792 (2003)	27,634,505 (2010)	82	10,066,508
Albania	1,965,500 (1964)	3,250,000	3,414,000	3,510,484	2,986,952 (July 2010 est.)	78	1,021,452
Poland	31,944,000	38,180,000	38,554,000	38,626,349 (2001)	38,192,000 (2010)	75	6,248,000
Hungary	10,212,000	10,553,000	10,261,000	10,106,017	9,979,000 (2010)	73	-142,000
Bulgaria	8,226,564 (1965)	8,980,000	8,443,000	7,707,495(2000)	7,351,234 (2011)	73	-875,330
United Kingdom	55,068,000 (1966)	57,411,000	58,091,000	58,789,194	62,008,048 (2010)	79	7,020,048
(Republic of Ireland) Ireland	2,884,002 (1966)	3,503,000	3,571,000	3,840,838 (2000)	4,470,700 (2010)	78	1,586,698
People's Republic of China	720,000,000	1,139,060,000	1,208,841,000	1,286,975,468 (2004)	1,339,724,852 (2010)	73	619,724,852
Japan‡	98,274,961 (1965)	123,537,000	124,961,000	127,333,002	127,420,000 (2010)	82	28,123,865
India#	511,115,000	843,931,000	918,570,000	1,028,610,328 (2001)	1,210,193,422 (2011)	69	699,078,422
Singapore	1,956,000 (1967)	3,003,000 (1990)	2,930,000 (1994)	4,452,732 (2002)	5,076,700 (2010)	82 (2008)	3,120,700
Monaco	24,000 (1967)	29,000 (1990)	N/A (1994)	31,842 (2000)	35,586 (2010)	(2008)	11,586
Greece	8,716,000 (1967)	10,123,000 (1990)	10,426,000 (1994)	10,964,020 (2001)	11,305,118 (2011)	N/A (2008)	2,589,118
Faroe Islands (Danish dependency)	38,000 (1967)	N/A (1990)	N/A (1994)	46,345 (2000)	48,917 (2010)	N/A (2008)	18,917
Liechtenstein	20,000 (1967)	29,000 (1990)	N/A (1994)	33,307 (2000)	35,789 (2009)	(2008)	15,789
South Korea	29,207,856 (1966)	42,793,000 (1990)	44,453,000 (1994)	48,324,000 (2003)	48,875,000 (2010)	(2008)	19,667,144
North Korea	12,700,000 (1967)	21,773,000 (1990)	23,483,000 (1994)	22,224,195 (2002)	24,051,218 (2010)	(2008)	11,351,218
Brunei	107,200 (1967)	266,000 (1990)	280,000 (1994)	332,844 (2001)	401,890 (2011)	76 (2008)	306,609
Malaysia	10,671,000 (1967)	17,861,000 (1990)	19,489,000 (1994)	21,793,293 (2002)	27,565,821 (2010)	(2008)	16,894,821
Thailand	32,680,000 (1967)	57,196,000 (1990)	59,396,000 (1994)	60,606,947 (2000)	63,878,267 (2011)	(2008)	31,198,267
Lebanon	2,520,000 (1967)	2,701,000 (1990)	2,915,000 (1994)	3,727,703 (2003)	4,224,000 (2009)	(2008)	
Syria	5,600,000 (1967)	12,116,000 (1990)	13,844,000 (1994)	17,585,540 (2003)	22,457,763 (2011)	-(2008)	
Bahrain	182,00 (1967)	503,000 (1990)	549,000 (1994)	667,238 (2003)	1,234,596 (2010)	75 (2008)	
Sri Lanka	11,741,000 (1967)	16,993,000 (1990)	17,685,000 (1994)	19,607,519 (2002)	20,238,000 (2009)	(2008)	
Switzerland	6,050,000 (1967)	6.712,000 (1990)	6,994,000 (1994)	7,261,200 (2002)	7,866,500 (2010)	(2008)	
Luxembourg	335,000 (1967)	381,000 (1990)	401,000 (1994)	439,539 (2001)	511,840 (2011)	(2008)	
Romania	19,105,056 (1966)	23,200,000 (1990)	22,736,000 (1994)	21,680,974 (2002)	21,466,174 (2011)	(2008)	
Niue (associated state of New Zealand)	1,900 (1966)	N/A (1990)	N/A (1994)	2,134 (2002)	1,398 (2009)	N/A (2008)	-502
Tokelau (New Zealand territory)	5,194 (1966)	N/A (1990)	N/A (1994)	1,445 (2001)	1,416 (2009)	N/A (2008)	-3,778
Jamaica	1,876,000 (1967)	2,420,000 (1990)	2,429,000 (1994)	2,695,867 (2003)	2,847,232 (2010)	74 (2008)	971,232
Argentina	32,031,000 (1967)	32,322,000 (1990)	34,180,000 (1994)	37,812,817 (2002)	40,091,359 (2010)	74 (2008)	8,060,359
France	49,890,660 (1967)	56,440,000 (1990)	57,747,000 (1994)	59,551,000 (2001)	63,136,180 (2011)	81 (2008)	
Italy	52,334,000 (1967)	57,662,000 (1990)	57,193,000 (1994)	56,995,744 (2002)	60,605,053 (2011)	80 (2008)	
Mauritius	774,000 (1967)	1,075,000 (1990)	1,104,000 (1994)	1,179,137 (2000)	1,288,000 (2009)	75 (2008)	514,000
Guatemala	4,717,000 (1967)	9,197,000 (1990)	10,322,000 (1994)	12,974,361 (2000)	13,276,517 (2009)	70 (2008)	8,559,517
Cuba	8,033,000 (1967)	10,609,000 (1990)	10,960,000 (1994)	11,177,743 (2002)	11,239,363 (2009)	77 (2008)	
Barbados	246,000 (1967)	255,000 (1990)	261,000 (1994)	250,012 (2001)	284,589 (2010)	73 (2008)	18,589
Samoa	131,377 (1967)	164,000 (1990)	164,000 (1994)	178,173 (2003)	179,000 (2009)	N/A (2008)	
Sweden	7,765,981 (1967)	8,559,000 (1990)	8,794,000 (1994)	8,920,705 (2002)	9,354,462 (2009)	81 (2008)	
Finland	4,664,000 (1967)	4,986,000 (1990)	5,095,000 (1994)	5,175,783 (2002)	5,374,781 (2010)	N/A (2008)	
Portugal	9,440,000 (1967)	10,525,000 (1990)	9,830,000 (1994)	10,355,824 (2001)	10,647,763 (2011)	N/A (2008)	
Austria	7,323,981 (1967)	7,712,000 (1990)	8,031,000 (1994)	8,032,926 (2001)	8,404,252 (2011)	N/A (2008)	
Libya	1,738,000 (1967)	4,545,000 (1990)	5,225,000(1994)	5,499,074 (2002)	6,420,000 (2009)	77 (2008)	
Peru	12,385,000 (1967)	21,550,000 (1990)	23,080,000(1994)	27,949,639 (2002)	29,496,000 (2010)	70 (2008)	
(Guinea-Bissau) Guinea Bissau	528,000 (1967)	965,000 (1990)	1,050,000 (1994)	1,345,479 (2002)	1,647,000 (2009)	48 (2008)	
Angola	5,203,066 (1967)	10,020,000 (1990)	10,674,000 (1994)	10,766,500 (2003)	18,498,000 (2009)	38 (2008)	
Equatorial Guinea	277,000 (1967)	348,000 (1990)	389,000 (1994)	474,214 (2000)	676,000 (2009)	61 (2008)	
Benin	2,505,000 (1967)	4,736,000 (1990)	5,246,000 (1994)	8,500,500 (2002)	8,791,832 (2009)	59 (2008)	
Laos	2,770,000 (1967)	4,139,000 (1990)	4,742,000 (1994)	5,635,967 (2002)	6,800,000 (2011)	56 (2008)	
Nepal	10,500,000 (1967)	18,961,000 (1990)	21,360,000 (1994)	25,284,463 (2002)	29,331,000 (2009)	(2008)	
Iran	25,781,090 (1966)	54,608,000 (1990)	59,778,000 (1994)	66,622,704 (2002)	75,330,000 (2010)	71 (2008)	49,548,910
Canada	20,014,880 (1966)	26,603,000 (1990)	29,248,000(1994)	31,081,900 (2001)	32,623,490 (2011)	81 (2008)	
United States	199,118,000 (1967)	249,995,000 (1990)	260,650,00(1994)	281,421,906 (2000)	308,745,538 (2010)	78 (2008)	
Uganda	7,931,000 (1967)	18,795,000 (1990)	20,621,000 (1994)	24,227,297 (2002)	32,369,558 (2009)	52 (2008)	

Notes
* Eritrea left Ethiopia in 1991.
† Split into the nations of Sudan and South Sudan during 2011.
‡ Japan and the Ryukyu Islands merged in 1972.
# India and Sikkim merged in 1975.

Population growth 1990–2012 (%)
Africa	73.3%
Middle East	68.2%
Asia (excl. China)	42.8%
China	19.0%
OECD Americas	27.9%
Non-OECD Americas	36.6%
OECD Europe	11.5%
OECD Asia Oceania	11.1%
Non-OECD Europe and Eurasia	−0.8%

== Future population ==
Human population projections are attempts to show how human populations might change in the future. These projections are an important input to forecasts of the population's impact on the planet and humanity's future well-being. Models of population growth take trends in human development and apply projections into the future. These models use trend-based-assumptions about how populations will respond to economic, social and technological forces to understand how they will affect fertility and mortality, and thus population growth.

Unlike UN projections that assume a plateau, some models suggest growth will remain positive because the technological progress driving the "demographic transition" may eventually slow down. Modern researchers hypothesize that Arithmetic Food Growth can be outpaced indefinitely if the rate of innovation remains high enough. Instead of food availability determining population, future population and income levels will determine the demand for food, which in turn incentivizes agricultural innovation. As technology advances, the demand for human capital increases; this makes child-rearing more expensive and time-intensive. Those advances would shift economy to require more educated labor. naturally slowing birth rates as societies become wealthier. In regions where technology and urbanization are lagging, Malthusian pressures, where population growth outstrips local resource production, remain a highly relevant analytical concern.

== See also ==
- An Essay on the Principle of Population
- Birth control
- Demographic history
- Demographic transition
- Density dependence
- Ecological overshoot
- Epidemiological transition
- Human population planning
- Irruptive growth
- Overshoot (population)
- Population ageing
- Population decline
- Population density
- Reproductive rights
- Sustainable population
- Women's rights
- World population
- Estimates of historical world population
- Zero population growth
