= Thomas McKeown (physician) =

British historian of medicine

- Born: Thomas McKeown; 2 November 1912; Portadown, Northern Ireland
- Died: 13 June 1988 (aged 75); Birmingham, England, UK
- Education: University of British Columbia, Vancouver; McGill University, Montreal; Oxford University, UK
- Known for: McKeown's thesis: The growth of population can be attributed to a decline in mortality from infectious diseases, primarily thanks to better nutrition, later also to better hygiene, and only marginally and late to medicine.
- Spouse: Esmé Joan Widdowson
- Awards: 1976 Rock Carling Fellowship of the Nuffield Trust 1981 Honorary Doctorate of McGill University, Montreal, Canada
- Scientific career
- Fields: Social medicine, Demography, Public Health, History of Medicine
- Workplaces: University of Birmingham (1945–1988)

Thomas McKeown (1912–1988) was a British physician, epidemiologist and historian of medicine. Largely based on demographic data from England and Wales, McKeown argued that the population growth since the late eighteenth century was due to improving economic conditions, i.e. better nutrition, rather than to better hygiene, public health measures, and improved medicine. This became known as the "McKeown thesis".

== Personal life ==
McKeown was born in Portadown, Northern Ireland and then moved to Vancouver, Canada with his parents. His parents were William McKeown and Mathilda (Duff) McKeown.

McKeown graduated in physiology at the University of British Columbia (1932) and obtained his first doctorate at McGill University (1935) before returning across the Atlantic to study as a Rhodes Scholar at Oxford University where he gained his DPhil in 1938. During wartime, he studied medicine at London University where he obtained a Bachelor in Surgery in 1942. In the early 1940s, the Nuffield Provincial Hospital Trust offered to finance a chair of social medicine at the newly founded University of Birmingham McKeown was appointed in 1945 as professor, not yet 33 years old, and held the chair until his retirement in 1977. In Birmingham, he also did his MD graduation in 1947. He is also known for his work in geriatrics and maternal-fetal medicine.

He was a consultant for the World Health Organization, Josiah Macy Foundation, Commonwealth Fund, and Rockefeller Foundation.

He died in 1988, and was survived by his wife Esmé and their son and daughter.

== Scientific contribution ==
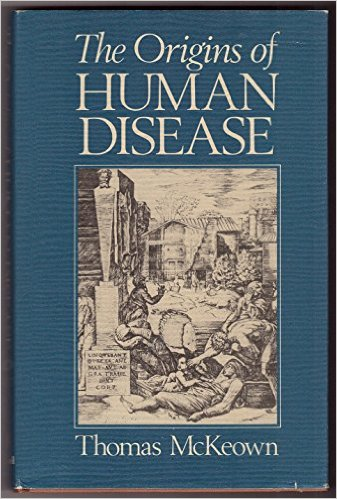
Thomas McKeown. The Origins of Human Disease. Original book cover, Basil Blackwell/Oxford, 1988.

McKeown developed his theories over a period of more than three decades between 1955 and shortly before he died in 1988. The seeds of his work can be found in four seminal papers published in the academic journal Population Studies, a book on Medicine in Modern Society in 1965, and a textbook (with C.R. Lowe) An Introduction to Social Medicine from 1966.

These earlier publications did not attract much attention beyond the academic community until he merged these publications in two controversial books: The Modern Rise of Population and, endowed by a Rock Carling Fellowship of the Nuffield Trust, a lecture with the provocative title The Role of Modern Medicine: Dream, Mirage or Nemesis?

In his last book, The Origins of Human Disease, published shortly after he died in 1988, he had found a milder tone to express his critical relativism of medicine and health. Here he had found the right balance between responding to legitimate criticism of the limitations of his thesis, without showing much mercy for unjust critics.

McKeown challenged four theories about the increase of the western population since the 18th century:

1. McKeown stated that the growth in population, particularly surging in the 19th century, was not so much caused by an increase in fertility, but largely by a decline of mortality particularly of childhood mortality followed by infant mortality,
2. The decline of mortality could largely be attributed to rising standards of living, whereby he put most emphasis on improved nutrition,
3. His most controversial idea, at least his most disputed idea, was that he questioned the effectiveness of public health measures, including sanitary reforms, vaccination and quarantine,
4. The sometimes very fierce disputes that his publication provoked around the "McKeown thesis", have overshadowed his more important and largely unchallenged argument that curative medical measures played little role in mortality decline, not only prior to the mid-20th century but also until well into the 20th century.

== Influence and criticism ==
The publication of The Modern Rise of Population (1976) provoked instant disagreement by demographers, but also yielded much acclaim from health critics. In the 1970s, an era wherein all aspects of social, economic and cultural establishment were challenged, McKeown found a receptive audience with other health critics such as Ivan Illich. By some researchers, including the economist and Nobel prize winner Angus Deaton, McKeown is considered as 'the founder of social medicine'.

McKeown's work continued to attract criticism for decades after his death in 1988. Sometimes his conclusions were criticised in mild terms: ‘His great virtue was to ask the right questions. He did not always provide the best answers.’

But others dismissed his work as ‘having been largely discredited by subsequent research’. This criticism led to rebuttals defending McKeown's thesis. McKeown repeatedly urged readers to rethink public health, medical care and social policy, implying that this would have political and financial benefits. The debate over the McKeown thesis has however been criticized as providing no such benefits. McKeown’s supporters supposedly ‘feel a continuing need for a McKeown peg on which to hang their hat, while others want a McKeown target at which to aim their darts.… Perhaps it is time to conclude that this cycle of thesis, antithesis, and synthesis has been played out, to give the ‘McKeown debate’ a dignified burial and to move on to other things.’

Despite this appeal to stop the McKeown debate, his work can still inspire admirers and infuriate opponents, even from within his own university.

What makes it even more complicated to value McKeown's work and its consequences is that he himself shaped and reshaped his ideas in a career that spans more than five decades, from his first publication in 1934 to his last book on The Origins of Human Disease in 1988. In this last book, McKeown resumes the themes that he had explored in his earlier publications, but also responded to previous critics and incorporated some of their arguments. By 1988, many of his earlier provocations were commonly shared ideas. Particularly the work of Nobel economic laureates Robert W. Fogel (1993) and Angus Deaton (2015) have greatly contributed to the recent reappreciation of the McKeown thesis: 'McKeown's views, updated to modern circumstances, are still important today in debates between those who think that health is primarily determined by medical discoveries and medical treatment and those who look to the background social conditions of life.' (Angus Deaton, page 91)

== Theses ==
=== Population growth ===
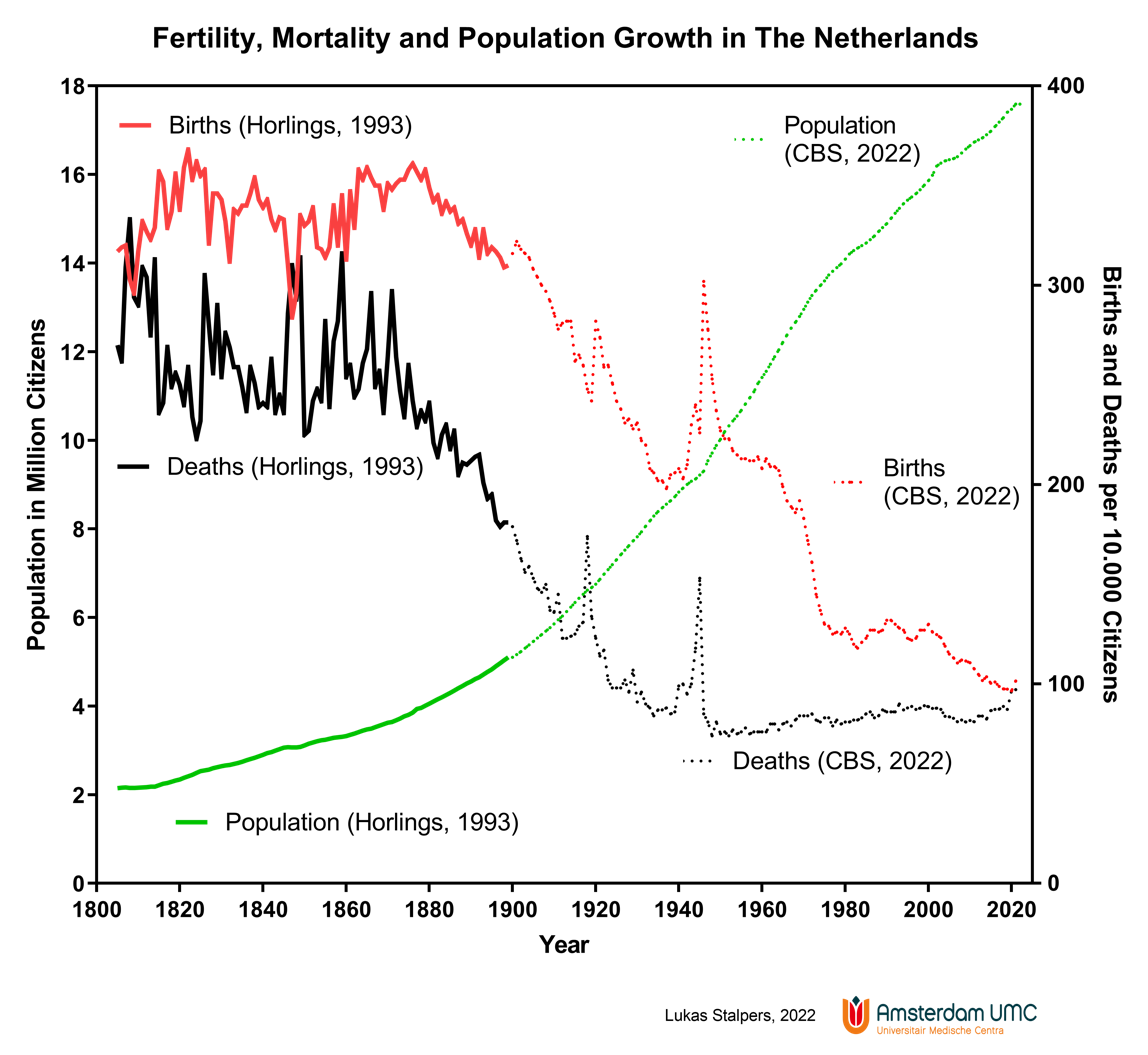
Population size, birth rate and death rate in the Netherlands from 1805 to 2022. Pre-industrial mortality and fertility showed major swings, largely dependent on period of prosperity, poverty, starvation and cholera epidemics until ~1870. Next, the mortality rate decreased more than the fertility rate, leading to a surge in population growth. The mortality peaks in the last year of the First and Second World Wars, are followed by birth peaks in the following year. (Merged data from Horlings, 1993 and Drukker & van Tassenaar, 1997 for data of the 19th century, and CBS-Statistics Netherlands for data since 1900)

Nowadays, very few will disagree with McKeown that the late 19th century surge of the population in the western world can be mainly ascribed to a fall in mortality and not to a rise in fertility. This was not that evident when he first published The Modern Rise in Population in 1976. Benson (1976) in a critical review of his book wrote that McKeown had insufficiently shown 'that it was mortality that fell and not fertility that rose to cause the population growth'. The present wealth of demographic data, both historical data from western countries dating back as early as the late 18th century, and more recent data from more recently developing countries consistently show similar patterns of a growing population with declining fertility, and declining mortality (see for example Figure 'Fertility, Mortality and Population Growth in the Netherlands).

In 1981, Wrigley and Schofield published an authoritative study on The Population History of England 1541–1871. Among many valuable findings on historical demography, and for the pre-industrial time largely based on studies of parish registers, they may in hindsight have overinterpreted the frequent birth peaks as evidence that an increase of the birth-rate was the predominant influence before the mid-nineteenth century. Already in 1974, Flinn described that such birth peaks were usually preceded by a period of mortality crises; however, as Flinn extensively describes, in times of turmoil deaths may not always have been accurately registered. Furthermore, as McKeown explained, it is very hard to biologically understand how a higher standard of living in early industrialisation could have selectively favoured fertility without decreasing mortality. Although he may have been unduly critical by stating that I should therefore explain that I do not think there is any treatment of the deficient material from the registers that would make it reliable [McKeown, 1988, page 9], his criticism was well taken.

Ten years later, Schofield and Reher (1991) were already far more appreciative of McKeown's work, not only that his controversial ideas had enormously boosted research of historical demography, but also that he proofed to be right on many points. The authors also appreciated the pre-industrial demographic patterns characterised by mortality peaks followed by fertility boosts. They however explained the initial phase of the population growth during the transition from late agricultural to early-industrial civilisation not so much by a decrease in mortality, as McKeown's had postulated, but by a stabilisation of mortality as Flinn (1974) called it. This early demographic transition characterised by The Attenuation of Mortality Crises started in Britain in the late 18th century and on the European continent about a half century later. Still in 2002, some critics of McKeown described this demographic controversy as one of his many flaws, not understanding that 'stabilisation of mortality' followed by 'decrease in both mortality and fertility' are perfectly complementary theories, as argued by Flinn (1971) and McKeown (1988) (and as illustrated by the Figure describing the population growth, fertility and mortality rates in the Netherlands from the pre-industrial early 19th century until the present day).

=== Wealth, food and health ===
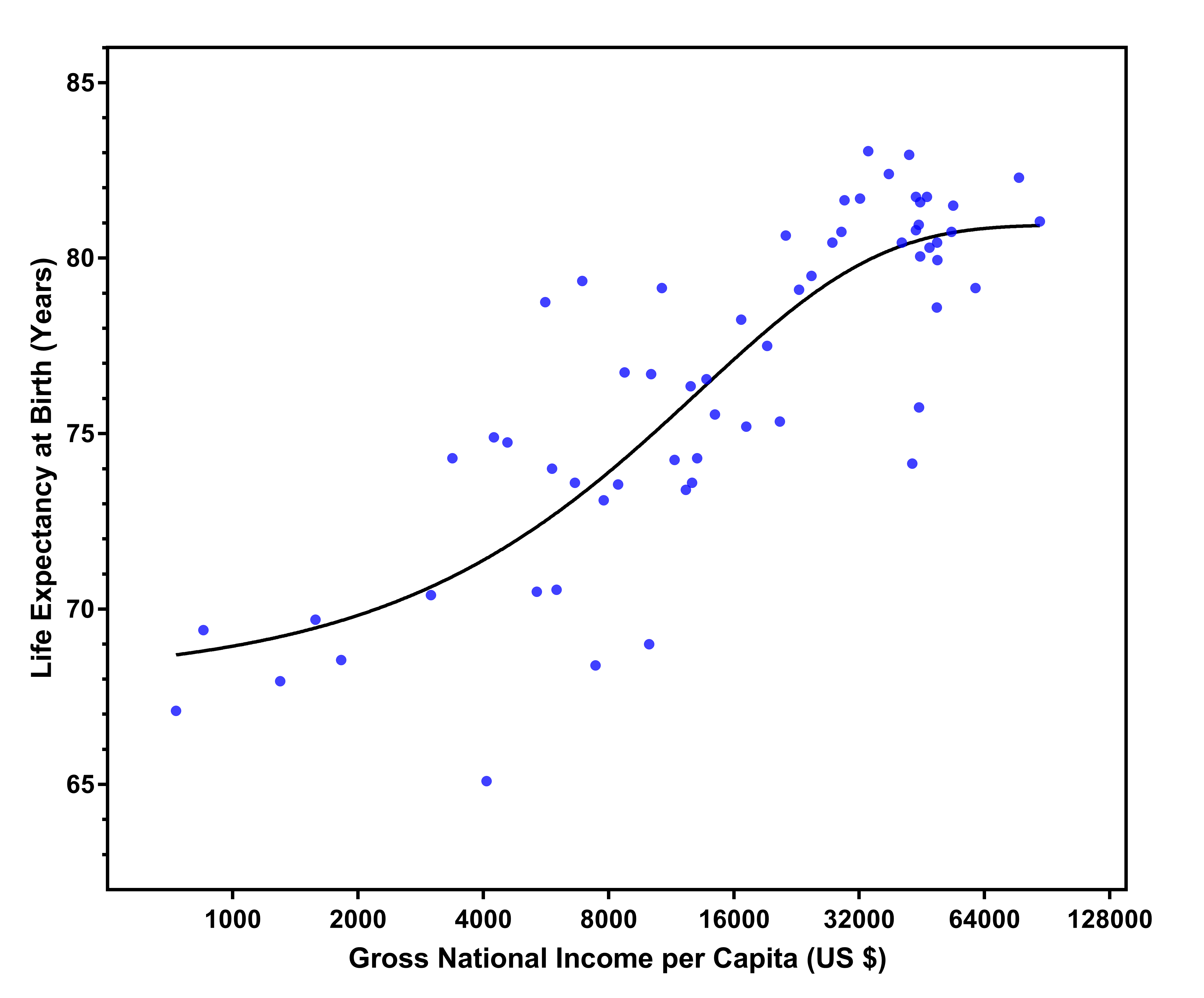
Gross National Income (GNI) per capita and life expectancy in 59 countries (on a log scale; WHO-data collected by Klenk et al., 2016)

Wealth and health: nowadays it is hard to imagine that only forty years ago there were scientists who doubted seriously that an increased standard of living was the main drive behind the growth of population, better health and a longer life expectancy. This doubt was probably cast by an idealisation of the living conditions of pre-historical hunters and gatherers, or by a nostalgic call for a return to the flower power of ancient agricultural life. McKeown was not blind to the social misery which was introduced by industrialisation, which led to overcrowded cities, poor housing, worsening of personal hygiene, foul drinking water, child labour and dangerous working conditions. He was puzzled why the population of England and Wales did increase despite these Dickensonian misery and poverty during early industrialisation.

An international comparison of present-day economies shows that average income and health are closely related, not only in poor countries, but also among rich countries, where life expectancy seems to have reached its biological ceiling (see Angus Deaton, 2013 for a detailed discussion).

In 1798, Thomas Malthus published An Essay on the Principles of Population wherein he argued that population growth was necessarily limited by the means of substinence; because he assumed that the land could never produce nor provide sufficient food for everyone, population growth will inevitably lead to famine, starvation and death. This became known as the Malthusian trap.

That Western population grew despite the vices of industrialisation was one of the main arguments why McKeown put so much emphasis on one of the few virtues of early industrialisation: the country was able to produce and provide more and better food for the people. Flinn (1971) already found for the pre-industrial 18th century that mortality crises were less than in the 17th century, and explained that by reduced fluctuations in food prices and fewer and less severe periods of famine by increased food imports during periods of failed crops, and by an agricultural transition from monoculture (grain) to more diverse products (rice, maize and buckwheat in the south, and potatoes in the north). Industrialization further improved the efficiency of food culturing, processing and transport.

Back in 1976, McKeown was criticised for failing to convince ‘that an improvement in per capita nutrition actually did occur’. McKeown was thereby criticised for using sloppy methodology; McKeown himself was well aware that his theory was hampered by insufficiency of then available data, particularly data from the early industrialisation during the 18th century, and he confided that he had deduced some of his conclusions ‘on the principle enunciated by Sherlock Holmes: When you have eliminated the impossible, whatever remains, however improbable, must be the truth. [McKeown, 1988; pages 9–10]

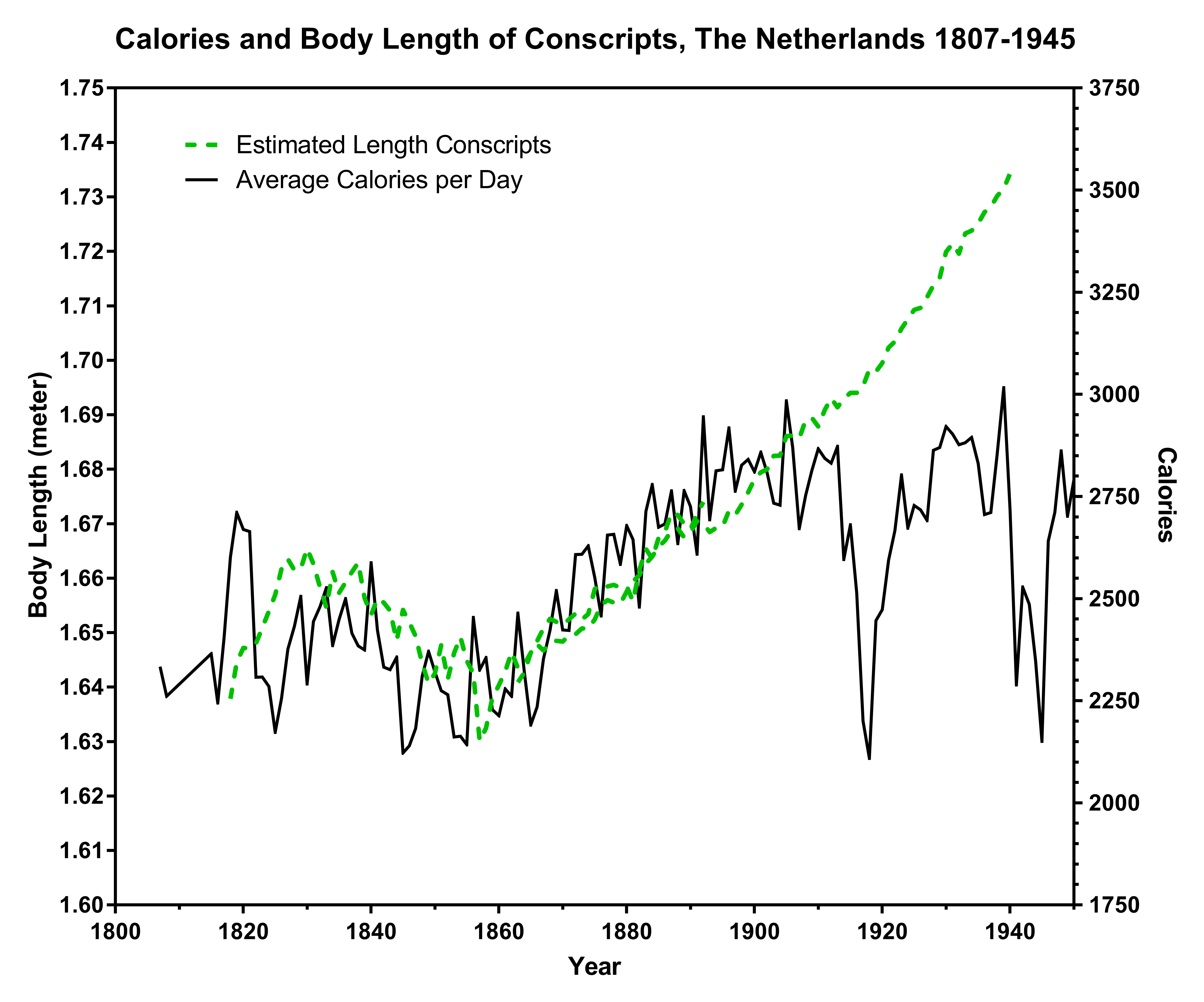
Average calorie intake and body length of Dutch conscripts between 1807 and 1945 (after Knibbe, 2007)

Since McKeown first proposed his thesis, several historians of economics have gathered supportive evidence for the McKeown thesis. Particularly the valuable work on the technophysio evolution by Nobel prize laureate economist Robert Fogel and collaborators has contributed to the acceptance of McKeown's thesis. As summarised by Angus Deaton (2013, pp 91–92):

'Nutrition was clearly part of the story of early mortality decline. ... With the beginnings of the agricultural revolution, the [Malthusian] trap began to fall apart. Per capita incomes began to grow and, perhaps for the first time in history, there was the possibility of steadily improving nutrition. Better nutrition enabled people to grow bigger and stronger, which further enabled productivity to increase. ... Taller, bigger people lived longer, and better nourished children were less likely to die and better able to ward off disease.'

Knibbe (2007) combined physiological indicators of health with economical data and discovered a direct relation between food intake, food price and health in the Netherlands of the 19th century; he for instance described a consistent relation between caloric intake and body length of Dutch conscripts between 1807 and the late 19th century (see Figure). Up to about 1898, changes in the biological standard of living were closely related to changes in the availability of food. After ~1898, the curves start to diverge: although the average caloric intake did not further increase, both body-length and life expectancy did increase until 1940. This also corroborates McKeown's assertion that public health measures started to boost the well-being of the population during the 20th century.

However, the strong correlation between calorie intake and longevity is not a proof that nutrition was the only reason for the decline of mortality, although it is an indispensable condition. As Angus Deaton concluded (page 92):

"There is no doubt that nutrition has improved and that people have become bigger, stronger, and healthier. But focusing entirely on food cannot provide a complete account for the decline in child mortality. Such an approach underplays the importance of the direct control of disease, and it focuses too much on the unaided role of the market economy and too little on the collective and political efforts that were behind the control of disease."

=== Hygiene and Public Health ===
By stressing the role of more and better nutrition as the leading cause of the decline of mortality, McKeown was accused of being too simplistic and negligent about the role of other factors that at the same time or later have improved the health and well-being of the population. Particularly his two books published in 1976 provoked a plethora of reactions, but also boosted research in demography, epidemiology and public health. This accumulated in the international conference on Medicine and the Decline of Mortality in Paris on the 22 to 25 June 1988; the collection of conference papers in The Decline of Mortality in Europe from 1991 remains a classic reader for historical demographers and historians of medicine. Although critical about the McKeown thesis, the tone of the contributions was already far milder than some fifteen years before. Most contributors by now acknowledged the importance of an improved standard of living in the decline of mortality, both in 19th century Europe as in present-day developing countries. It was no longer disputed that food was indispensable for a decrease in mortality, but that other environmental improvements which came with more wealth, i.e. hygienic measures, had to work at the same time. Many studies gave convincing arguments that Public Health measures such as better housing, clean water supply, sewage and sanitation, vaccination and health education improving personal hygiene may, in western Europe, have become increasingly important since the end of the 19th century. McKeown himself, in The Origins of Human Disease, fully acknowledged this 20th century role of Public Health.

Nevertheless, there remained critics who felt that McKeown was falling short, particularly for his negligence of the role of Public Health. A semantic problem, as pointed out by Simon Szreter (2002), is that Public Health is a poorly defined field of medicine in the twilight zone between the responsibility of the state or government and health care provided by physicians and nurses. The drilling of clean water wells, the construction of sewage systems, and legislation resulting in better housing, better education and improved working conditions is in most countries the responsibilities of the state, and it is surely not a good idea to make a public health professional responsible for the drilling, masonry and the enforcement of housing regulation. McKeown was not a politician, and it is quite absurd to hold him responsible for the virtual dismantlement (of public health) during the last 2 decades of the 20th century. McKeown was actively involved in the organisation of medical care in Britain, and he was a frequent advisor for the WHO, and yes, together with Archie Cochrane, he was fairly critical about a wild growth of unevaluated public health interventions and expensive medical care facilities of which the efficacy had not been demonstrated. But nowhere in his papers, reports nor his books did he advocate the dismantlement of the (British national) health system, nor did he promote free market economy (which very few economists still consider a benefit to economy).

=== Tuberculosis and the minor role of Personal Medical Care ===
McKeown questioned the contribution of 'medical measures, that is prevention or treatment of disease in the individual' (ISM page 9) and demonstrated his thesis for the decline of many, if not all, infectious diseases since the 19th century. As early as 1955, the American immunologists had already shown that the mortality of various infectious diseases had already so much declined since ~1900, that the mortality reduction from vaccines was marginal, and that from antibiotics could not be demonstrated. McKeown gave similar results for England and Wales, showing that the mortality from infectious diseases was already so very low by the time that these treatments were introduced in medical practice, that they have contributed little to the reduction of overall mortality and the population growth.

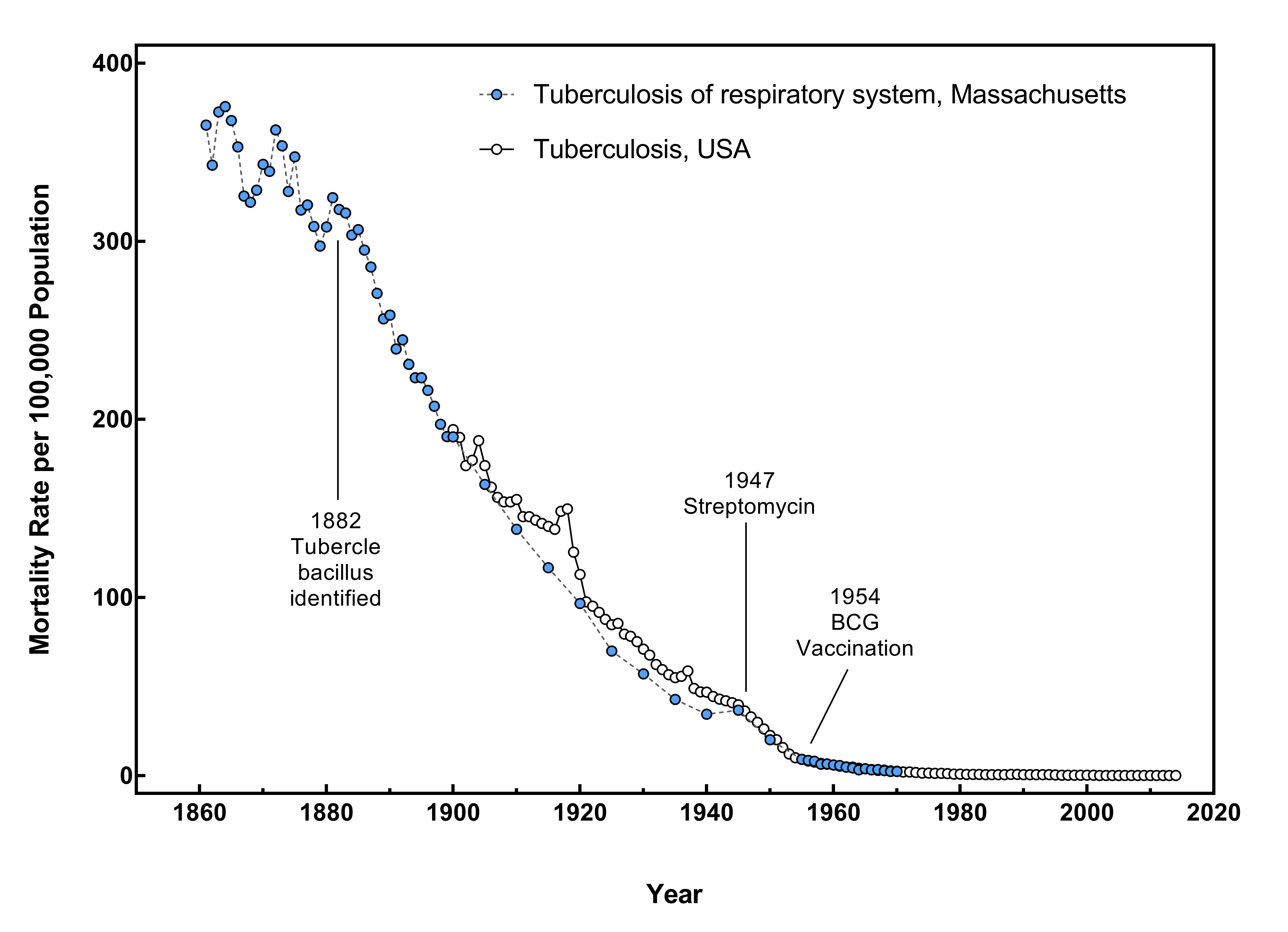
Merged mortality rates of 'tuberculosis of respiratory system' in Massachusetts 1861–1970, and 'tuberculosis' USA 1900–2014 (Data collected from reports of the US Census Bureau and CDC-Wonder / the US Center for Disease Control (CDC); AMC-University of Amsterdam, 2016)

An example that he repeatedly used was the falling mortality from tuberculosis in England and Wales since the 19th century, well before the introduction of the first effective antibiotic drug in 1947 and BCG vaccination in 1954. (ISM page 9; TMRoP, page 93; TROM, page 81; TOoHD page 79). The Figure shows comparable data for the fall in tuberculosis mortality in the USA between 1861 and 2014. In 1861, the mortality rate from tuberculosis was 365 per 100,000 and might have been much higher in the century before, and was lower than 0,2 per 100,000 in 2014. By the time of the introduction of streptomycin, the first effective antibiotic drug, in 1947 and BCG-vaccination in 1954, the mortality rate from tuberculosis had already dropped to 33,1 per 100,000, a 91% decrease. However, he found that specific age groups did show an accelerated decrease in mortality after introduction of streptomycin.(TRoM, page 82-83) Streptomycin prevented 51% of deaths from tuberculosis between 1948 and 1971, but overall, antibiotics and vaccination have only contributed 3.2% to the mortality reduction from tuberculosis since the 19th century.

A Dutch study found a similar small effect of penicillin on overall mortality since its introduction shortly after World War II, but showed an accelerated decrease in mortality rate for some specific bacterial infections. Remarkably, the authors of this Dutch study considered their results as evidence that McKeown's theory was wrong, and the study is therefore frequently cited to refute instead of confirm McKeown's thesis.

== Books ==
- McKeown, Thomas. Medicine in Modern Society: Medical Planning Based on Evaluation of Medical Achievement. George Allen & Unwin Ltd, London, UK, 1965
- McKeown, Thomas, and Lowe, C.R. An Introduction to Social Medicine. Blackwell Scientific Publications, Oxford and Edinburgh, Uk, 1966.
- McKeown, Thomas. The Modern Rise of Population. London: Edward Arnold, 1976
- McKeown, Thomas. The Role of Medicine: Dream, Mirage, or Nemesis? Princeton University Press (Princeton Legacy Library), 1980. Previously, “The role of medicine: Dream, mirage or nemesis?” The Rock Carling Fellowship, 1976. The Nuffield Provincial Hospitals Trust, London UK, 1976 report for the Nuffield Trust
- McKeown, Thomas. The Origins of Human Disease. Oxford: Basil Blackwell, 1988.
