= American Economic Review =

- Discipline: Economics
- Language: English
- Edited by: Erzo FP Luttmer

Publication details
- History: 1911–present
- Publisher: American Economic Association
- Frequency: Monthly

Standard abbreviations
- ISO 4: Am. Econ. Rev.

Indexing
- ISSN: 0002-8282
- LCCN: 11007619
- JSTOR: 00028282
- OCLC no.: 847300958

Links
- Journal homepage; Online access

The American Economic Review is a monthly peer-reviewed academic journal first published by the American Economic Association in 1911. The current editor-in-chief is Erzo FP Luttmer, a professor of economics at Dartmouth College. The journal is based in Pittsburgh. It is one of the "top five" journals in economics.

In 2004, the American Economic Review began requiring "data and code sufficient to permit replication" of a paper's results, which is then posted on the journal's website. Exceptions are made for proprietary data.

Until 2017, the May issue of the American Economic Review, titled the Papers and Proceedings issue, featured the papers presented at the American Economic Association's annual meeting that January. After being selected for presentation, the papers in the Papers and Proceedings issue did not undergo a formal process of peer review. Starting in 2018, papers presented at the annual meetings have been published in a separate journal, AEA Papers and Proceedings, which is released annually in May.

== History ==
The American Economic Association was founded in 1885. From 1886 until 1907 the association published the Publications of the American Economic Association. The first volume was published in six issues, from March 1886 to January 1887. The second volume in 1887–1888, and so on, until Volume XI in 1896. In that same year an issue with "General Contents and Index of Volumes I to XI" appeared. Most of the volumes contained only one text, for instance volume IV, issue 2 (April 1889) which contained an article by Sidney Webb, entitled "Socialism in England".

In December 1897, a new series started, with only two issues.

In 1900 the third series started, with four issues yearly; this lasted until 1908.

For the next three years the association published what was called The Economic Bulletin. It also appeared in four issues yearly. Every issue of the Bulletin contained a section "Personal and Miscellaneous Notes" and a number of book reviews.

In parallel with the Bulletin, during the years 1908 to 1910, the American Economic Association Quarterly was published. Its header read "Formerly published under the title of Publications of the American Economic Association and the numbering continued as third series, volumes 9 to 11.

In March 1911, the first issue of The American Economic Review was published.

== Notable papers ==
In 2011 a "Top 20 Committee", consisting of Kenneth Arrow, Douglas Bernheim, Martin Feldstein, Daniel McFadden, James M. Poterba, and Robert Solow, selected the following twenty articles to be the most important ones to appear in the journal:

- "A Theory of Production" (1928), by Paul Douglas and Charles Cobb.
- "The Use of Knowledge in Society" (1945), by F. A. Hayek.
- "Economic Growth and Income Inequality" (1955), by Simon Kuznets.
- "The Cost of Capital, Corporation Finance and the Theory of Investment" (1958), by Franco Modigliani and Merton Miller.
- "A Theory of Optimum Currency Areas" (1961), by Robert Mundell.
- "Uncertainty and the Welfare Economics of Medical Care" (1963), by Kenneth Arrow.
- "Capital Theory and Investment Behavior" (1963), by Dale W. Jorgenson
- "National Debt in a Neoclassical Growth Model" (1965), by Peter A. Diamond.
- "The Role of Monetary Policy" (1968), by Milton Friedman.
- "Migration, Unemployment and Development: A Two-Sector Analysis" (1970), by John R. Harris and Michael Todaro.
- "Optimal Taxation and Public Production I: Production Efficiency" and "Optimal Taxation and Public Production II: Tax Rules" (1971), by Peter A. Diamond and James Mirrlees.
- "Production, Information Costs, and Economic Organization" (1972), by Armen Alchian and Harold Demsetz.
- "Some International Evidence on Output-Inflation Tradeoffs" (1973), by Robert Lucas, Jr.
- "The Economic Theory of Agency: The Principal's Problem" (1973), by Stephen A. Ross.
- "The Political Economy of the Rent-Seeking Society" (1974), by Anne Osborn Krueger.
- "Monopolistic Competition and Optimum Product Diversity" (1977), by Avinash Dixit and Joseph Stiglitz.
- "An Almost Ideal Demand System" (1980), by Angus Deaton and John Muellbauer.
- "On the Impossibility of Informationally Efficient Markets" (1980), by Sanford J. Grossman and Joseph E. Stiglitz.
- "Scale Economies, Product Differentiation, and the Pattern of Trade" (1980), by Paul Krugman.
- "Do Stock Prices Move Too Much to Be Justified by Subsequent Changes in Dividends?" (1981), by Robert J. Shiller.

Thirteen of those authors have received the Nobel Memorial Prize in Economic Sciences.

The journal can be accessed online via JSTOR. In both 2006 and 2007, it was the most widely viewed journal of all the 775 journals in JSTOR.

=== Other notable papers ===
Other notable papers from the journal include:

- "Colonial origins of comparative development" (2001), by Daron Acemoglu, Simon Johnson, and James A. Robinson.
- "Growth in a Time of Debt" (May 2010), by Carmen Reinhart and Kenneth Rogoff, published in the Papers and Proceedings issue.
- "Some Unsettled Problems of Irrigation", by Katharine Coman. This was the first article that appeared in the journal, and was reprinted in 2011 due to its continuing significance.

== Controversy ==
In 2016, an anonymous group of economists collaboratively wrote a note alleging academic misconduct by the authors and editor of a paper published in the American Economic Review. The note was published under the name Nicolas Bearbaki in homage to Nicolas Bourbaki.
