= Top Five Journals in Economics =

The Top Five Journals in Economics are the five academic journals that are traditionally considered to be the most prestigious journals in economics. The journals in question are the American Economic Review, Econometrica, Journal of Political Economy, Quarterly Journal of Economics, and the Review of Economic Studies. These journals are highly cited within economics, and are often treated separately from other journals in studies of the economics literature.

Many economists believe that these top five journals have an outsized influence on the field of economics, and have expressed concerns regarding this. For instance, at the 2017 AEA annual meeting, five prominent economists discussed such concerns in a round-table discussion titled "The Curse of the Top Five." A follow-up study published in the Journal of Economic Literature found that (despite a substantial share of influential publications appearing in outlets other than top five journals) publication in top five journals correlated strongly with tenure decisions, and claims that reliance on just these five journals to screen talent may incentivize careerism over creativity.
