= John Muellbauer =

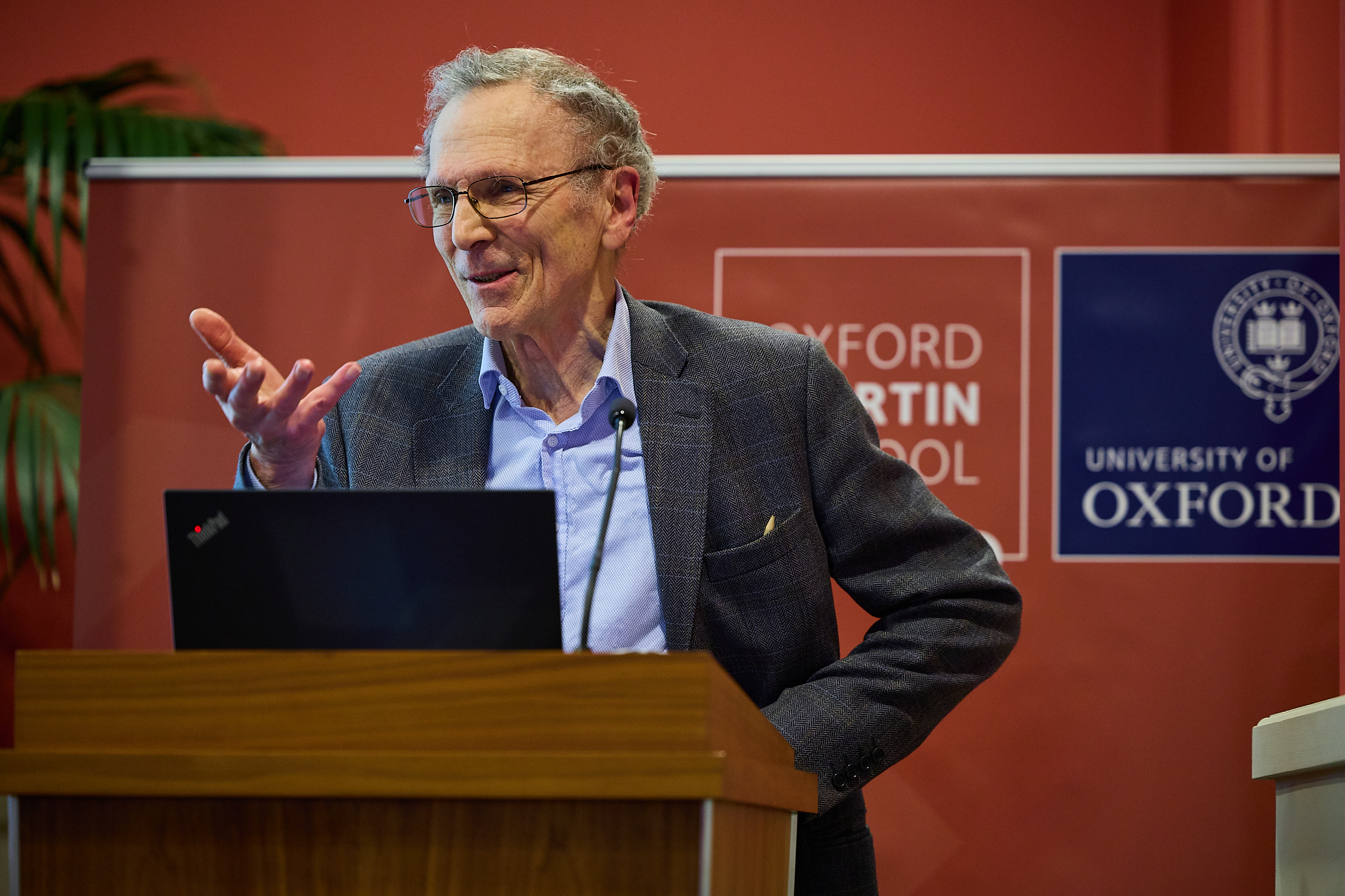
- Professor John Muellbauer speaks at an event at the University of Oxford in 2024
- Born: July 17, 1944 (age 82)

Academic background
- Education: King's College, Cambridge; University of California, Berkeley

Academic work
- Discipline: Applied microeconomics and macroeconomics
- Institutions: University of Oxford
- Notable ideas: Almost Ideal Demand System (AIDS)
- Awards: Fellow of the British Academy; Fellow of the Econometric Society; Emeritus Fellow of the European Economic Association

John Norbert Joseph Muellbauer FBA (born 17 July 1944) is a British economist noted for influential contributions to applied microeconomics and macroeconomics, especially in consumer demand, housing economics, and macro-financial modelling. He co-developed the Almost Ideal Demand System (AIDS) with Angus Deaton and co-authored the graduate text Economics and Consumer Behaviour (1980). Beginning in the late 1980s, he was one of the first economists to focus on the complex interactions between housing markets and the economy. Over subsequent decades, he extended his research to the roles of household balance sheets, credit constraints, and housing markets, developing econometric techniques to measure unobserved credit conditions and demonstrating how housing booms and busts transmit to the real economy. In 2014, Muellbauer wrote a famous call for a 'quantitative easing for people' in the Eurozone.

He is Senior Research Fellow of Nuffield College, Oxford and of the Institute for New Economic Thinking at the Oxford Martin School, University of Oxford.

== Education and career ==
Muellbauer was born in Bavaria, Germany, and moved with his family to the United Kingdom in the early 1950s. He read economics at King's College, Cambridge, and completed a Ph.D. at the University of California, Berkeley, where he studied with Daniel McFadden, Dale W. Jorgenson, and Robert Hall.

He began his academic career at the University of Warwick in 1969, moved to Birckbeck College, University of London in 1972 (becoming Professor of Economics), and joined Nuffield College, Oxford in 1981, later serving as Professor of Economics and Senior Research Fellow, as well as Investment Bursar during the bursting of the Dot-com bubble in 2000–2002, and the global financial crisis and its aftermath during 2008–2016. Muellbauer has held visiting fellowships at the European Central Bank and the South African Reserve Bank and has advised numerous central banks and governments on housing, credit markets, and macro-financial policy.

== Honours ==
Muellbauer was elected Fellow of the Econometric Society (1975), Fellow of the British Academy (1997), and Fellow of the European Economic Association (2006). He has served on the editorial boards of Econometrica and The Review of Economic Studies. He continues to advise central banks and policy institutions worldwide, including recently conducting an independent review for the Czech National Bank.

== Major scholarly contributions ==
Muellbauer's early research used duality theory to model welfare and demand, introducing "generalised linearity" and "price-independent generalised linearity" preference classes that enabled aggregation across heterogeneous households with fewer restrictions. He applied duality to cost-of-living indices, and household equivalence scales. With Angus Deaton, he developed the Almost ideal demand system (AIDS) model, a cornerstone of empirical demand analysis and one of the most cited American Economic Review papers. Their book Economics and Consumer Behaviour integrated duality theory with applied demand systems and remains influential.

From the late 1970s he shifted to macroeconomics, challenging New Classical models and representative-agent Euler-equation approaches as in Robert Hall's Random walk model of consumption, to the life-cycle/permanent-income hypothesis. With Anthony Murphy, he showed how housing markets and financial liberalisation increased borrowing against home equity, making consumption highly sensitive to house-price cycles, anticipating research on collateral channels and the Great Recession. His work highlighted institutional heterogeneity in transmitting credit and monetary policy shocks.

Research with Anthony Murphy and Gavin Cameron developed regional house-price and migration models with links between labour markets and housing dynamics illuminating regional evolutions. To measure shifts in credit conditions, Muellbauer introduced latent-variable methods—later termed the "Latent Interactive Variable Equation System" (LIVES)—to derive credit-conditions indices from joint systems of consumption, debt, and mortgage data. Extended with Janine Aron, Valerie Chauvin, John Duca and others to the US, Canada, Germany, France, and South Africa, this improved consumption models by incorporating credit supply shifts.

A prominent critic of Dynamic stochastic general equilibrium models without financial frictions, he argued for credit-augmented consumption functions and household balance-sheet channels in central-bank policy models. With Duca and Murphy he synthesised international evidence on mortgage finance, credit standards, and macroeconomic amplification. He and Aron provided UK evidence on mortgage-default and foreclosure channels, and later analysed macroprudential policy from a housing perspective.

With Aron, he has also authored over 25 papers on South African monetary and macroprudential policy since the late 1990s, often in collaboration with the South African Reserve Bank. For the UK, he improved the measurement of capacity utilization, showing demand-driven fluctuations explain much of short-term output per head, not exogenous productivity shocks, confirming Dale W. Jorgenson and Zvi Griliches's insight.

Forecasting has been another strand, including gross domestic product, inflation, and mortgage defaults. With Aron he built equilibrium-correction models of the price level, improving US inflation forecasts and analysing exchange-rate pass-through in emerging economies. Reduced-form income forecasting models replicating household responses to structural breaks such as the Global Financial Crisis supported the generalised consumption function as an alternative to conventional policy models.

== Major policy contributions ==
Policy relevance has been central to his career. Early work examined how inflation differently affects rich and poor, and how to better incorporate child costs in poverty measurement. Concern over European unemployment and Thatcher-era UK policies motivated research on productivity, macroeconomic policy, credit markets, and housing. He was an early critic of the Poll Tax, later returning to property tax reform, a more general analysis of policy errors made in the Thatcher-era, and a holistic set of reforms of the UK’s housing policy framework.

His Centre for Economic Policy Research columns have addressed falling house prices and recession (2008), Eurobonds, helicopter money and fiscal rules, UK tax reform for intergenerational justice, central-bank models of consumption, excess mortality in COVID, drivers of house-price cycles, land value taxation, and parallels between what he and Janine Aron call the ‘Global Climate Accelerator’ and the financial accelerator that operated in the Global Financial Crisis. His Financial Times columns have focused on urban planning and UK property taxation.

== Selected publications ==
Deaton, A & Muellbauer, J (1980). "An Almost Ideal Demand System". American Economic Review. 70 (3): 312–326.

Deaton, A & Muellbauer, J (1980). Economics and Consumer Behaviour. Cambridge University Press.
