= Nuffield Trust =

British health care think tank

The Nuffield Trust, formerly the Nuffield Provincial Hospitals Trust, is a charitable trust with the mission of improving health care in the UK through evidence and analysis.

The Nuffield Trust is registered with the Charity Commission as charity number 209169, and is a company limited by guarantee registered in England with company number 00382452. The patron is Anne, Princess Royal. The Chief Executive of the Trust is Thea Stein, and the chair of the Board is Martin Marshall.

== History ==
The Nuffield Trust was established in December 1939 as the Nuffield Provincial Hospitals Trust by Viscount Nuffield (William Morris), the founder of Morris Motors. It was set up to coordinate the activities of all hospitals operating outside London and helped inspire the creation of the National Health Service. Indeed, one of its first tasks was a complete survey of hospitals, which was used as a key reference document in the establishment of the NHS.

In 1998 the Trust adopted the name The Nuffield Trust for Research and Policy Studies in Health Services, retaining "The Nuffield Trust" as its working name.

The Nuffield Trust is entirely independent of the other charities and organisations bearing Viscount Nuffield's name. It therefore has no connection to those organisations, including Nuffield Health.

== Areas of work ==
The Nuffield Trust is a centre of research and analysis, and focus their activities on six priority areas: workforce; technology and digital; primary care; small hospitals; quality and equity; and politics, legislation and governance.

Since its foundation the Nuffield Trust has commissioned a wide range of research on how to improve the health system in the UK, for instance by a Rock Carling Fellowship.

In 1971, the epidemiologist Archie Cochrane received a Rock Carling Fellowship to write Effectiveness and efficiency: Random reflections on health services. He argued for greater use of randomised control trials in assessing medical evidence and led to the creation of Cochrane.

In 1976, the British public health scientist and health care critic, Thomas McKeown, MD, received the Rock Carling Fellowship, which allowed him to write The role of medicine: Dream, mirage or nemesis?. Therein he summarized facts and arguments that supported what became known as the McKeown's thesis, i.e. that the growth of population can be attributed to a decline in mortality from infectious diseases, primarily thanks to better nutrition, later also to better hygiene, and only marginally and late to medical interventions such as antibiotics and vaccines. McKeown was heavily criticized for his controversial ideas, but is nowadays remembered as 'the founder of social medicine'.

On 28 February 2020, the Trust published a new five-year strategic plan, stating that it aims to produce commentary and research with three main aims:

- To challenge and support those involved in planning and delivering health care to think more creatively and innovatively about how to adapt and redesign services to meet changing patient needs
- To provide information on the evidence, statistics, facts and research which politicians and policy-makers use in their interventions in the health and care system in the UK
- To be respected and highly regarded by their main audiences; to remain separate from but expert in the NHS and social care; and above all to use their independence, highly skilled staff and unique position to be a force for good in improving the health and social care of the UK population.

== See also ==
- List of UK think tanks
- Social research
- Health and Social Care Act 2012
- National Health Service (England)
