= Robert Fogel =

American economist and Nobel laureate (1926–2013)

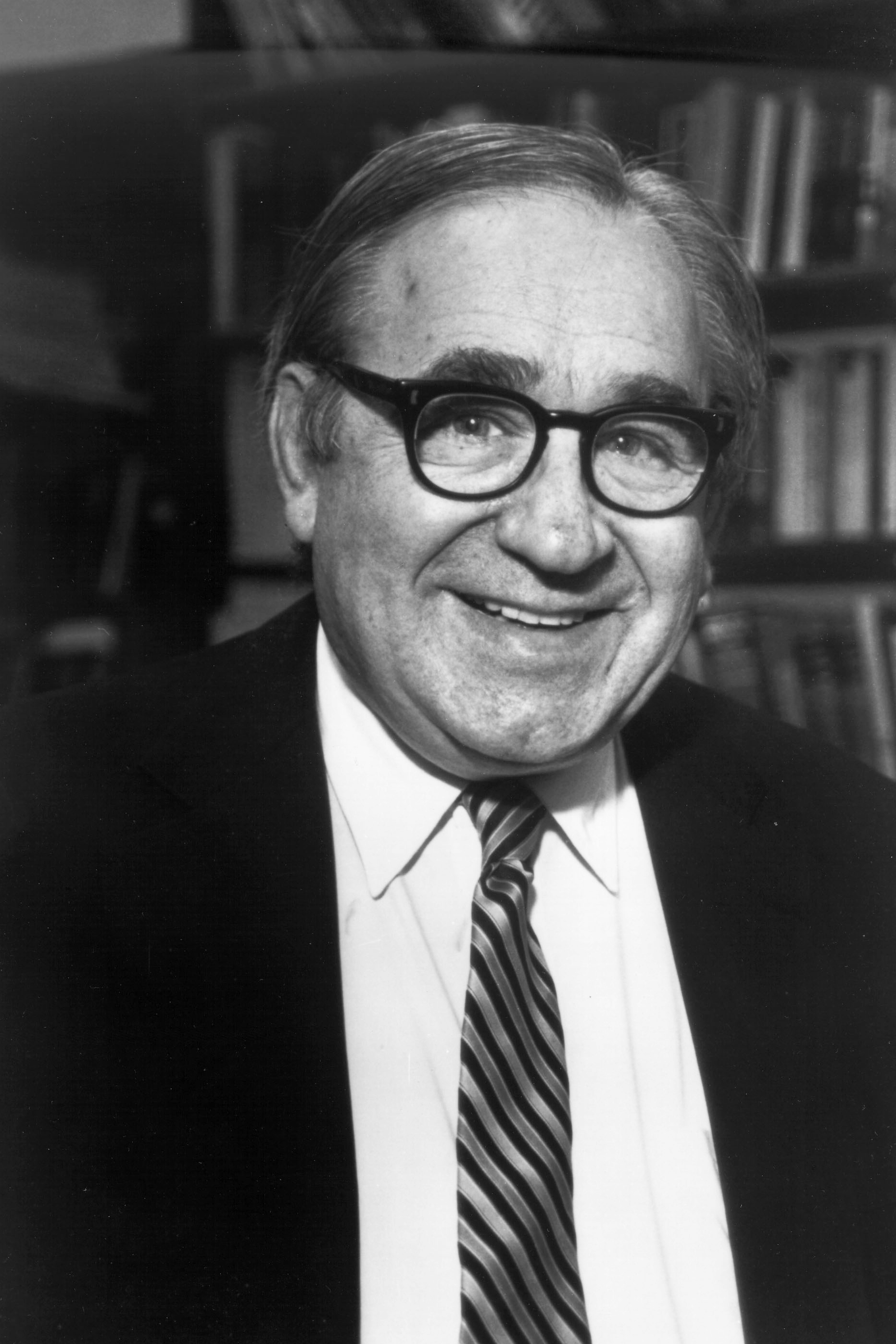
- Born: July 1, 1926; New York City, U.S.
- Died: June 11, 2013 (aged 86); Oak Lawn, Illinois, U.S.

Academic background
- Education: Cornell University (BA 1948); Columbia University (MA 1960); Johns Hopkins University (PhD 1963)
- Doctoral advisor: Simon Kuznets
- Other advisors: Evsey Domar; Abba Lerner; Fritz Machlup; George Stigler

Academic work
- Discipline: Economic history Cliometrics
- School or tradition: Chicago School
- Institutions: Johns Hopkins University; University of Rochester; University of Chicago; Harvard University
- Awards: Nobel Memorial Prize in Economic Sciences (1993); Bancroft Prize (1975)
- Website: Information at IDEAS / RePEc

Robert William Fogel (/ˈfoʊɡəl/; July 1, 1926 – June 11, 2013) was an American economic historian and winner (with Douglass North) of the 1993 Nobel Memorial Prize in Economic Sciences. As of his death, he was the Charles R. Walgreen Distinguished Service Professor of American Institutions and director of the Center for Population Economics (CPE) at the University of Chicago's Booth School of Business. He is best known as an advocate of cliometrics, an approach to history emphasizing the use of quantitative methods.

== Early life and education ==
Fogel was born on July 1, 1926, in New York City, the son of Ukrainian Jewish immigrants from Odessa (1922). His brother, six years his senior, was his main intellectual influence in his youth as he listened to him and his college friends intensely discuss social and economic issues of the Great Depression.

He graduated from the Stuyvesant High School in 1944. Upon his graduation he found himself with a love for literature and history and aspired for a career in science, but due to an extreme pessimism about the economy in the second half of the 1940s, he shifted his interest towards economics.

He was educated at Cornell University, where he majored in history with an economics minor, and became president of the campus branch of American Youth for Democracy, a communist organization. After graduation in 1948, he became a professional organizer for the Communist Party during which time he approved the expulsion of future fellow historians of slavery Eugene Genovese and George Rawick.

After working eight years as a professional organizer, he rejected communism as unscientific and attended Columbia University, where he studied under George Stigler and obtained an MA in economics in 1960. He received a PhD from Johns Hopkins University in 1963 under advisor Simon Kuznets; there, he also studied with Abba Lerner, Evsey Domar, T. C. Liu, and Fritz Machlup.

== Career ==
Fogel began his research career as an assistant professor at the University of Rochester in 1960. In 1964 he moved to the University of Chicago as an associate professor. From 1968 to 1975 he was also a visiting professor at Rochester in autumn semesters. During this time he completed some of his most important works, including Time on the Cross (in collaboration with Stanley Engerman). He also mentored a large group of students and researchers in economic history, including his colleague Deirdre McCloskey at Chicago.

In 1975 he left for Harvard University, and from 1978 on he worked as a research associate under the National Bureau of Economic Research in Cambridge, Massachusetts. In 1981 he returned to the University of Chicago, where he directed the newly created Center for Population Economics at the Booth School of Business and rose to the named chair of Charles R. Walgreen Distinguished Service Professor of American Institutions, named for Chicago businessman Charles R. Walgreen. He won the 1993 Nobel Memorial Prize in Economic Sciences.

Fogel researched and wrote on numerous fields in his career, including not only economic history but also demographics, physiology, sociology of the family, nutrition, China's economic development, philosophy of science, and other related fields. He is best known as an advocate of cliometrics, an approach to history focused on the use of quantitative data and methods. He integrated insights from such diverse fields in his attempts to explain important historical phenomena such as the dramatic fall in mortality rates from the 18th to the 20th century. His former colleague Deirdre McCloskey credits Fogel with "reuniting economics and history". He advised many students who went on to become prominent economic historians, so that many economic historians in the United States trace their academic lineage to him.

Fogel was elected to the American Academy of Arts and Sciences in 1972, the National Academy of Sciences in 1973, the fellows of the Agricultural History Society in 1995, and the American Philosophical Society in 2000.

== Personal life and death ==
Fogel married Enid Cassandra Morgan, an African-American woman, in 1949, and had two children. The couple faced significant difficulties at the time due to anti-miscegenation laws and prevalent sentiments against interracial marriages.

He died on June 11, 2013, in Oak Lawn, Illinois, of a short illness, aged 86.

== Contributions ==
=== Cliometrics and Railroads and American Economic Growth ===
Fogel's first major study involving cliometrics was Railroads and American Economic Growth: Essays in Econometric History (1964). This tract sought to quantify the railroads' contribution to U.S. economic growth in the 19th century. Its argument and method were each rebuttals to a long line of non-numeric historical arguments that had ascribed much to expansionary effect to railroads without rigorous reference to economic data.

Fogel argued against these previous historical arguments to show that onset of the railroad was not indispensable to the American economy. Examining the transportation of agricultural goods, Fogel compared the 1890 economy to a hypothetical 1890 economy in which transportation infrastructure was limited to wagons, canals, and natural waterways. Fogel pointed out that the absence of railroads would have substantially increased transportation costs from farms to primary markets, particularly in the Midwest, and changed the geographic location of agricultural production. Despite this consideration, the overall increase in transportation costs, i.e., the "social savings" attributable to railroads, was small – about 2.7% of 1890 GNP. The potential for substitute technologies, such as a more extensive canal system or improved roads, would have further lowered the importance of railroads. The conclusion that railroads were not indispensable to economic development made a controversial name for cliometrics.

=== Slavery and Time on the Cross ===
Fogel's most famous and controversial work is Time on the Cross (1974), a quantitative study of American slavery, co-written with Stanley Engerman. In the book, Fogel and Engerman argued that slavery was profitable for slave owners as economies of scale meant larger slave farms were more productive, per unit of labor, than northern farms. This contradicted the consensus at the time, set by Ulrich Phillips but common among many different schools of history that as in ancient Rome slavery was unprofitable compared to free labor and so would eventually die out on its own.

A portion of Time on the Cross focused on how slave owners treated their slaves. Engerman and Fogel argued that because slave owners approached slave production as a business enterprise, there were some limits on the amount of exploitation and oppression they inflicted on the slaves. According to Engerman and Fogel, slaves in the American South lived better than did many industrial workers in the North. Fogel based this analysis largely on plantation records and claimed that slaves were whipped only occasionally, worked less and were better fed – although the authors were careful to state explicitly that slaves were still exploited in ways which were not captured by measures available from records.

This portion of Time on the Cross created a firestorm of controversy, although it was not directly related to the central argument of the book – that Southern slave plantations were profitable for the slave owners and would not have disappeared in the absence of the Civil War. Some criticisms mistakenly considered Fogel an apologist for slavery. In fact, Fogel objected to slavery on moral grounds; he thought that on purely economic grounds, slavery was not unprofitable.

=== Without Consent or Contract: The Rise and Fall of American Slavery ===
In 1989 Fogel published Without Consent or Contract The Rise and Fall of American Slavery as a response to criticism stemming from what some perceived as the cold and calculating conclusions found in his earlier work, Time on the Cross. In it he very clearly spells out a moral indictment of slavery when he references things such as the high infant mortality rate from overworked pregnant women, and the cruel slave hierarchies established by their masters. He does not write so much on what he had already established in his previous work, and instead focuses on how such an economically efficient system was threatened and ultimately abolished.

Using the same measurement techniques he used in his previous work, he analyzed evidence pertaining to the lives of slaves, but he focused much more on the social aspects versus economics this time. He both illustrated how hard and life-threatening the work of a slave was, as well as how they were able to form their own culture as a resistance to slavery. He explains how a small group of very vocal and committed Evangelical Christian reformers led the fight against slavery until it became a political force that captured the attention of the President of the United States. His book delves into why some of America's most widely respected leaders went from seeing slavery as a highly profitable workforce (which his findings indicated was true) to something that must be abolished on moral grounds.

=== Christianity and the abolition of slavery ===
Fogel emphasized the contribution of Christian abolitionists to ending slavery in the United States. He distinguished slavery's economic profitability from its moral legitimacy, identifying its fundamental wrong with one person's unrestricted domination over another. Discussing the findings of Without Consent or Contract in 1993, he argued that market forces could not have eliminated an economically efficient and profitable institution. Abolition instead required political intervention informed by an antislavery ethic that, in his account, arose primarily from religious reformers' convictions. His former student and teaching assistant John B. Carpenter recalled that Fogel expressed surprise at discovering the central role Christians had played in ending American slavery.

Fogel's interpretation gave particular importance to Puritan and Quaker influences in changing Northern public opinion against slavery. He connected nineteenth-century abolitionism with the Second Great Awakening, describing a progression from efforts to make slaveholding incompatible with church membership to political organizing through the Liberty Party and subsequently the Republican Party. He also acknowledged divisions among evangelicals over slavery, distinguishing abolitionist reformers from those who opposed their objectives.

=== The Fourth Great Awakening ===
In 2000 Fogel published The Fourth Great Awakening and the Future of Egalitarianism in which he argued that America has been moving cyclically toward greater equality, largely because of the influence of religion, especially evangelicalism. Building on his work on the demise of slavery, he proposed that since evangelicalism was largely responsible for ending the institution he found to be economically profitable, that religion would continue to fuel America's moral development. Fogel diagrammed four "Great Awakenings", called (by others) "The Fogel Paradigm." "Fogel's paradigm is drawn from what he believes are cycles of ethical challenges America has undergone provoked by technological innovations that create moral crises that, in turn, are resolved by evangelical awakenings."

=== Later work: The Technophysio Evolution ===
Fogel was the director of the Center for Population Economics (CPE) at the University of Chicago and the principal investigator of the NIH-funded Early Indicators of Later Work Levels, Disease and Death project, which draws on observations from military pension records of over 35,000 Union Army veterans.

Much of Fogel's late writing incorporated the concept of technophysio evolution, a process that he described as "the synergism between rapid technological change and the improvement in human physiology." By using height as a proxy for health and general well-being, Fogel observed dramatic improvements in health, body size, and mortality over the past 200 years. This phenomenon is examined more fully in The Escape from Hunger and Premature Death, 1700–2100: Europe, America, and the Third World and The Changing Body: Health, Nutrition, and Human Development in the Western World since 1700 (both published by Cambridge University Press).

The work of Fogel was largely influenced by the McKeown thesis. Since 1955, the British public health scientist Thomas McKeown had developed a theory that the growth of population since the 18th century can be attributed to a decline in mortality from infectious diseases, largely to a better standard of living, particularly to better nutrition, but later also to better hygiene, and only marginally and late to medicine. The work of Fogel and collaborators provided the necessary evidence that more and better food was the main drive for the reduction in mortality from infectious diseases. As summarized by Noble laureate Angus Deaton (2013, pp. 91–92):

Nutrition was clearly part of the story of early mortality decline. ... With the beginnings of the agricultural revolution, the [Malthusian] trap began to fall apart. Per capita incomes began to grow and, perhaps for the first time in history, there was the possibility of steadily improving nutrition. Better nutrition enabled people to grow bigger and stronger, which further enabled productivity to increase, setting up a positive synergy between improvements in incomes and improvements in health, each feeding off the other. When the bodies of children are deprived of the nutrients they need to grow, brain development is also unlikely to reach its full potential, so these larger, better-off people may also have been smarter, further adding to economic growth and speeding up the virtuous circle. Taller, bigger people lived longer, and better nourished children were less likely to die and better able to ward off disease.

— Angus Deaton, The Great Escape. Health, wealth, and the origins of inequality

== The Nobel Memorial Prize in Economic Sciences ==
In 1993, Robert Fogel received, jointly with fellow economic historian Douglass C. North, the Nobel Memorial Prize in Economic Sciences "for having renewed research in economic history by applying economic theory and quantitative methods in order to explain economic and institutional change". In his Nobel lecture, titled "Economic growth, population theory, and physiology: the bearing of long-term processes on the making of economic policy", he emphasised his work done on the question of nutrition and economic growth.

== Selected works ==
- The Union Pacific Railroad: A Case in Premature Enterprise, 1960.
- Railroads and American Economic Growth: Essays in Econometric History, 1964.
- Time on the Cross: The Economics of American Negro Slavery, 2 volumes, 1974. (co-written with Stanley Engerman)
- Which Road to the Past?, 1983.
- Without Consent or Contract: The Rise and Fall of American Slavery, 2 volumes, 1989, ISBN 978-0393312195.
- Economic Growth, Population Theory and Physiology: The Bearings of Long-Term Processes on the Making of Economic Policy, 1994.
- The Slavery Debates, 1952–1990: A Retrospective . Baton Rouge: Louisiana State University Press, 2003. 106 pp. ISBN 0807128813.
- The Fourth Great Awakening and the Future of Egalitarianism Chicago: University of Chicago Press, 2000.
- The Escape from Hunger and Premature Death, 1700–2100: Europe, America, and the Third World. New York: Cambridge University Press, 2004. 189pp. ISBN 0521808782.
- The Changing Body: Health, Nutrition, and Human Development in the Western World since 1700 (co-written with Roderick Floud, Bernard Harris, and Sok Chul Hong), New York: Cambridge University Press, 2011, ISBN 978-0521879750
- Explaining Long-Term Trends in Health and Longevity, 2012.
- Political Arithmetic: Simon Kuznets and the Empirical Tradition in Economics (co-written with Enid M. Fogel, Mark Guglielmo, and Nathaniel Grotte), Chicago: University of Chicago Press, 2013, ISBN 978-0226256610

== See also ==
- List of economists
- Economics and Human Biology
- List of Nobel Laureates affiliated with the University of Rochester
- List of Jewish Nobel laureates
