= Almost ideal demand system =

Consumer demand model

The Almost Ideal Demand System (AIDS) is a consumer demand model used primarily by economists to study consumer behavior. The AIDS model gives an arbitrary second-order approximation to any demand system and has many desirable qualities of demand systems. For instance it satisfies the axioms of order, aggregates over consumers without invoking parallel linear Engel curves, is consistent with budget constraints, and is simple to estimate.

== Model ==
The AIDS model is based on a first specification of a cost/expenditure function c(u,p):

$$\log(c(u,p))=\alpha_{0}+\sum_{k}\alpha_{k}\log(p_{k})+\frac{1}{2}\sum_{k}\sum_{j}\gamma_{kj}^{*}\log(p_{k})\log(p_{j})+u\beta_{0}\prod_{k}p_{k}^{\beta_{k}}$$

where p stand for price of L goods, and u the utility level. This specification satisfies homogeneity of order 1 in prices, and is a second order approximation of any cost function.

From this, demand equations are derived (using Shephard's lemma), but are however simpler to put in term of budget shares $w_i = \frac{\partial \log c(u, p) } {\partial \log p_i}$:

This leads to the estimable equation:

$$w_{i}=\alpha_{i}+\sum_{j}\gamma_{ij}\log(p_{j})+\beta_{i}\log\{x/P\}$$

with:

- $x = \log c(u, p)$ is the total expenditure,
- $\gamma_{ij}=\frac{\gamma^*_{ij}+\gamma^*_{ji}} 2$,
- P is the price index defined by $\log(P)\equiv\alpha_{0}+\sum_{k}\alpha_{k}\log(p_{k})+\frac{1}{2}\sum_{k}\sum_{j}\gamma_{kj}\log(p_{k})\log(p_{j})$

Under relevant constraints on the parameters $\alpha, \beta, \gamma$, these budget shares equations share the properties of a demand function:

- homogeneous of degree 0 in prices and total expenditure
- sum of budget shares add up to 1 (i.e., $\sum w_i=1$)
- satisfy the symmetry of the Slutsky matrix

== Origin ==
First developed by Angus Deaton and John Muellbauer, the AIDS system is derived from the "Price Invariant Generalized Logarithmic" (PIGLOG) model which allows researchers to treat aggregate consumer behavior as if it were the outcome of a single maximizing consumer.

== Applications ==
Many studies have used the AIDS system to determine the optimal allocation of expenditure among broad commodity groups, i.e., at high levels of commodity aggregation.

In addition, the AIDS system has been used as a brand demand system to determine optimal consumption rates for each brand using product category spending and brand prices alone. Assuming weak separability of consumer preferences, the optimal allocation of expenditure among the brands of a given product category can be determined independently of the allocation of expenditure within other product categories.

== Extensions ==
An extension of the almost ideal demand system is the Quadratic Almost Ideal Demand System (QUAIDS) which was developed by James Banks, Richard Blundell, and Arthur Lewbel. It considers the existence of non-linear Engel curve which is not expressed in the standard almost ideal demand system.
