= Angus Deaton =

British-American economist (born 1945)

Sir Angus Deaton
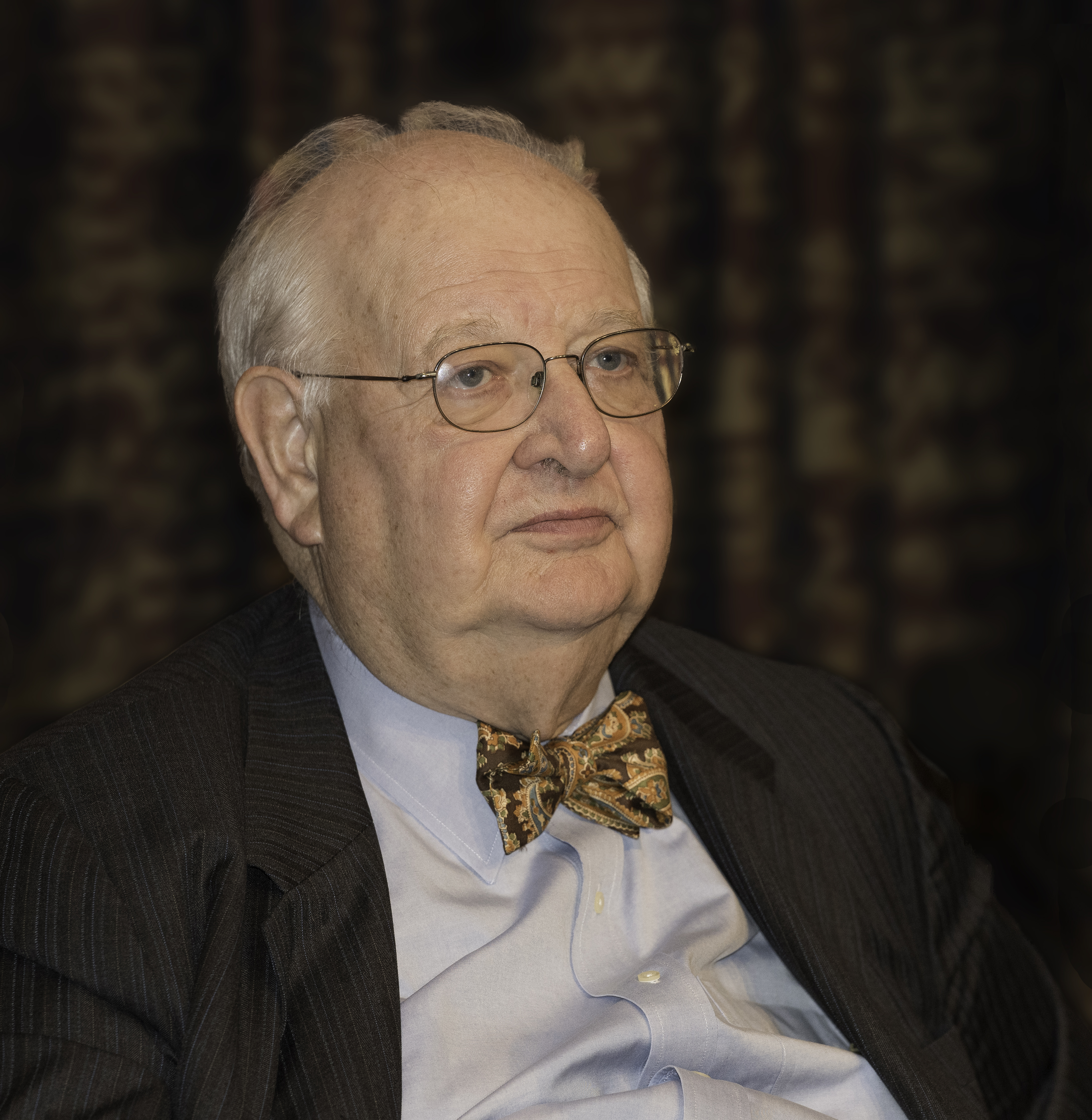
- Deaton in 2015
- Born: Angus Stewart Deaton; 19 October 1945 (age 81); Edinburgh, Scotland
- Spouse: Anne Case

Academic background
- Education: Hawick High School; Fettes College; Fitzwilliam College, Cambridge
- Thesis: Models of Consumer Demand and Their Application to the United Kingdom (1975)
- Doctoral advisor: Richard Stone

Academic work
- Discipline: Microeconomics
- Institutions: University of Bristol; Princeton University; University of Southern California
- Awards: Frisch Medal (1978); Nobel Memorial Prize in Economic Sciences (2015); Member of the National Academy of Sciences (2015)
- Website: Information at IDEAS / RePEc

Sir Angus Stewart Deaton FBA (born 19 October 1945) is a British-American economist and academic. Deaton is a Senior Scholar and the Dwight D. Eisenhower Professor of Economics and International Affairs Emeritus (since 2016) at the Princeton School of Public and International Affairs and the Economics Department at Princeton University. His research focuses primarily on poverty, inequality, health, wellbeing, and economic development.

In 2015, he was awarded the Nobel Memorial Prize in Economic Sciences for his analysis of consumption, poverty, and welfare.

== Early life and education ==
Angus Deaton presenting himself, December 2015

Deaton was born in Edinburgh, Scotland. He attended Hawick High School and then Fettes College as a foundation scholar, working at Portmeirion Hotel in the summer of 1964. He earned his B.A., M.A. and Ph.D. degrees at the University of Cambridge, the last with a 1975 thesis entitled Models of Consumer Demand and Their Application to the United Kingdom under the supervision of Richard Stone. At Cambridge, he was a student and later a fellow at Fitzwilliam College, and a research officer working with Richard Stone and Terry Barker in the Department of Applied Economics.

== Career ==
In 1976 Deaton took up a post at the University of Bristol as Professor of Econometrics. During this period, he completed a significant portion of his most influential work. In 1978, he became the first ever recipient of the Frisch Medal, an award given by the Econometric Society every two years to an applied paper published within the past five years in Econometrica. In 1980, his paper on how demand for various consumption goods depends on prices and income was published in The American Economic Review. This paper has since been hailed as one of the twenty most influential articles published in the journal in its first hundred years.

In 1983, he left the University of Bristol for Princeton University. He is currently the Dwight D. Eisenhower Professor of International Affairs and Professor of Economics and International Affairs at the Princeton School of Public and International Affairs and the Department of Economics at Princeton. Since 2017, he holds a joint appointment with the University of Southern California where he is the Presidential Professor of Economics. He holds both British and American citizenship.

In 2015, Deaton won that year's Nobel Memorial Prize in Economic Sciences. Deaton was "delighted" and described himself as "someone who's concerned with the poor of the world and how people behave, and what gives them a good life." The Royal Swedish Academy of Sciences said that economic policy intended to reduce poverty could only be designed once individuals' consumption choices were understood, saying, "More than anyone else, Angus Deaton has enhanced this understanding. By linking detailed individual choices and aggregate outcomes, his research has helped transform the fields of microeconomics, macroeconomics, and development economics". In 2016, Deaton became a Senior Scholar and Emeritus Professor.

Deaton is also the author of "Letters from America", a popular semi-annual feature in the Royal Economic Society Newsletter.

In 2024, Deaton wrote about having changed his mind on a large part of the mainstream economics he had previously supported, concluding that economists' mistakes showed how "Economists could benefit by greater engagement with the ideas of philosophers, historians, and sociologists, just as Adam Smith once did".

== Scholarship ==
=== Almost Ideal Demand System ===
Deaton's first work to become known was Almost Ideal Demand System (AIDS), which he developed with John Muellbauer and published in The American Economic Review (AER) in 1980. As a consumer demand model, it provides a first-order approximation to any demand system that satisfies the axioms of order, aggregates over consumers without invoking parallel linear Engel curves, is consistent with budget constraints, and is simple to estimate.

According to a review by the American Economic Review, the paper "introduces a practical system of demand equations that are consistent with preference maximization and have sufficient flexibility to support full welfare analysis of policies that have an impact on consumers." The paper was listed as one of the top 20 published works in the AER in the first 100 years of the journal.

=== Morbidity and Mortality in the 21st Century ===
In 2015, Anne Case and Angus Deaton published the paper "Rising morbidity and mortality in midlife among white non-Hispanic Americans in the 21st century" in the Proceedings of the National Academy of Sciences. In the article, Case and Deaton highlight the rising all-cause mortality rate among middle-aged white non-Hispanic Americans in the past decade, a recent trend that was unique among "rich" countries. Case and Deaton found that the rising mortality rates were only occurring for white non-Hispanics and that less-educated white non-Hispanics were at the greatest risk. Further, they discovered that the increasing mortality rates among white non-Hispanics could be classified as "deaths of despair", most notably drug and alcohol poisonings, suicide, and chronic liver diseases and cirrhosis." Finally, they noted that rising mortality rates were accompanied by rising morbidity rates, particularly "[s]elf-reported declines in health, mental health, and ability to conduct activities of daily living, and increases in chronic pain and inability to work". To explain their findings, Case and Deaton point to the rising availability and abuse of opioids:

The increased availability of opioid prescriptions for pain that began in the late 1990s has been widely noted, as has the associated mortality. The CDC estimates that for each prescription painkiller death in 2008, there were 10 treatment admissions for abuse, 32 emergency department visits for misuse or abuse, 130 people who were abusers or dependent, and 825 nonmedical users ... [A]ddictions are hard to treat and pain is hard to control, so those currently in midlife may be a "lost generation" whose future is less bright than those who preceded them.

As a follow-up to their previous work, Case and Deaton received funding from the National Institute on Aging through the National Bureau of Economic Research to release a larger study that was published in 2017 entitled Mortality and Morbidity in the 21st Century. In extending their research, they found that the mortality rates for educated white non-Hispanics have begun to decrease again, although the rates for uneducated white non-Hispanics have continued to climb; at the same time, rates for Hispanics and blacks continued to decrease, regardless of educational attainment. Additionally, they found that contemporaneous resources had no effect on mortality rates and that, instead, worsening labor market opportunities for uneducated white non-Hispanics have pushed forward several cumulative disadvantages for middle-aged people, such as worsened marriage and child outcomes, and overall health.

As a result of this research, Case has opined that physical and mental distress may bolster candidates like Donald Trump and Bernie Sanders. Likewise, the Washington Post and a Gallup Poll showed strong correlation between support for Trump and higher death rates.

=== Recognition and awards ===
- 1978—Frisch Medal, an award given by the Econometric Society
- 2007—Elected president of the American Economic Association.
- 2011—Awarded BBVA Foundation Frontiers of Knowledge Award of Economics, Finance and Management for his fundamental contributions to the theory of consumption and savings, and the measurement of economic wellbeing.
- 2014—Elected to the American Philosophical Society.
- 2015—Elected a member of the National Academy of Sciences.
- 2015—Awarded with the Nobel Prize in Economic Sciences for his analysis of consumption, poverty, and welfare.
- 2016—Knighted in the 2016 Queen's Birthday Honours List for services to research in economics and international affairs.
- 2016—Listed #14 (along with Anne Case) on the Politico 50 guide to the thinkers, doers and visionaries transforming American politics in 2016.

Deaton is a Fellow of the Econometric Society, the British Academy (FBA), and the American Academy of Arts and Sciences.

He holds honorary degrees from the University of Rome, Tor Vergata; University College London; the University of St. Andrews; and the University of Edinburgh.

== Personal life ==
Previously widowed, Deaton has two children, born in 1970 and 1971. He is married to Anne Case, the Alexander Stewart 1886 Professor of Economics and Public Affairs at Princeton University's Princeton School of Public and International Affairs. The couple enjoy the opera and trout fishing. He has declined to comment on whether he supports independence for his native Scotland but said that he has a “strong personal and historical attachment to the Union".

=== Political views ===
In June 2024, 16 Nobel Prize in Economics laureates, including Deaton, signed an open letter arguing that Donald Trump’s fiscal and trade policies coupled with efforts to limit the Federal Reserve's independence would reignite inflation in the United States.

== Books ==
- Deaton, Angus; Muellbauer, John (1980). Economics and Consumer Behavior. New York: Cambridge University Press. ISBN 0521228506.
- Deaton, Angus. (1981). Essays in the Theory and Measurement of Consumer Behaviour. New York: Cambridge University Press. ISBN 9780521067553.
- Deaton, Angus (1992). Understanding Consumption. Clarendon Lectures in Economics. Oxford: Clarendon Press. ISBN 0198287593.
- Deaton, Angus (1997). The Analysis of Household Surveys: A Microeconometric Approach to Development Policy. Baltimore: Johns Hopkins University Press for the World Bank. ISBN 0801852544.
- Deaton, Angus; Zaidi, Salman. (2002). Guidelines for Constructing Consumption Aggregates for Welfare Analysis. New York: World Bank Press. ISBN 0821349902.
- Deaton, Angus; Kozel, Valerie, eds. (2005). The Great Indian Poverty Debate. New Delhi: Macmillan India Ltd. ISBN 9781403926449.
- Deaton, Angus (2013). The Great Escape: Health, Wealth, and the Origins of Inequality. Princeton: Princeton University Press. ISBN 9780691153544.
- Case, Anne; Deaton, Angus (2020). Deaths of Despair and the Future of Capitalism. Princeton University Press. ISBN 978-0691190785.
- Deaton, Angus (2023). Economics in America: An Immigrant Economist Explores the Land of Inequality. Princeton University Press. ISBN 978-0691247625.

== Selected journal articles ==
- Deaton, Angus; J Muellbauer (1980). An almost ideal demand system, The American economic review 70 (3), 312-326
- Deaton, Angus (1991). Saving and Liquidity Constraints. Econometrica. 59 (5).
- Deaton, Angus (March 2003). Health, Inequality, and Economic Development, Journal of Economic Literature

Academic offices
Preceded by Avinash Dixit	President of the American Economic Association; 2009– 2010	Succeeded by Robert Hall
Awards
Preceded by Jean Tirole	Laureate of the Nobel Memorial Prize in Economics; 2015	Succeeded by Oliver Hart; Bengt Holmström
