= Excise =

Goods tax levied at the moment of manufacture rather than sale

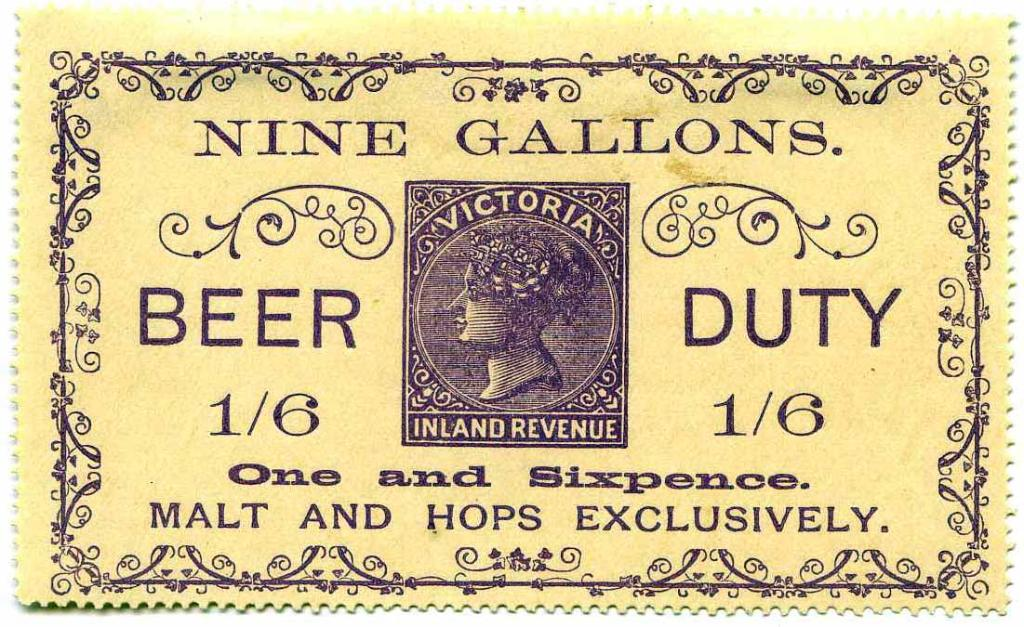
An 1892 beer duty stamp, noting the cost of the duty (one shilling and sixpence), the unit taxed (9 gallons), its target (malt and hops exclusively), and its source (inland revenue).

An excise, or excise tax, is any duty on a category of goods that is normally levied by a government at the moment of manufacture for domestic consumption. This makes excise different from a sales tax or value-added tax (which are levied at a point of sale) or from customs duties (which are levied on goods when they cross a designated border).

An excise is considered an indirect tax, meaning that the producer or seller who pays the levy to the government is expected to try to recover their loss by raising the price paid by the eventual buyer of the goods. Excise is thus a tax that relates to a quantity, not a value, as opposed to the value-added tax which concerns the value of a good or service. Excises are typically imposed in addition to an indirect tax such as a sales tax or value-added tax (VAT). Typically, an excise is distinguished from a sales tax or VAT in three ways:

1. an excise is typically a per unit tax, costing a specific amount for a volume or unit of the item purchased, whereas a sales tax or value-added tax is an ad valorem tax and proportional to the price of the goods,
2. an excise typically applies to a narrow range of products, and
3. an excise is typically heavier, accounting for a higher fraction of the retail price of the targeted products.

Typical examples of excise duties are taxes on alcohol and alcoholic beverages (alcohol tax, for example, may consist of a levy of n euros per hectolitre of alcohol sold); manufactured tobacco (cigars, cigarettes, etc.); energy products (oil, gas, etc.); vehicles; or luxury products. The legislator's aim is to discourage the consumption of products it considers to have a negative externality (sometimes referred to as sin tax).

More recently, excise duty has been introduced on certain forms of transport considered to be polluting (such as air transport) or on the consumption of products that generate polluting waste that is little or not at all recycled or harmful to the environment (such as electronic products, certain plastic packaging, etc.).

These are the oldest sources of revenue for governments around the world. In 2020, consumption taxes accounted for 30% of total tax revenues in OECD countries on average, equivalent to 9.9% of GDP in these countries.

== History and rationale ==
Excise has existed in English since the late 15th century and was borrowed from Middle Dutch echijns and excijs, meaning 'excise on wine or beer', which was apparently altered from earlier (13th century) assise, assijs, which meant simply a tax on consumption and is related to Medieval Latin accisia, assisia, assisa 'tax, excise duty'. The exact derivation is unclear and is presumed to come from several roots.

Excise was introduced to England from the Netherlands in the mid-17th century under the Puritan regime, as a tax, an excise duty, levied on drinks in 1650. In the British Isles, upon the Restoration of the Monarchy, many of the Puritan social restrictions were overturned, but excise was re-introduced, under the Tenures Abolition Act 1660, in lieu of rent, for tenancies of royally-owned land which had not already become socage. Although the affected tenancies were limited in number, the excise was levied more generally; at the time, there was thought to be a rough correspondence between the wealthy manufacturers of affected goods, and the wealthy tenants of royal land.

Excise duties or taxes continued to serve political as well as financial ends. Public safety and health, public morals, environmental protection, and national defense are all rationales for the imposition of an excise. In defense of excises on strong drink, Adam Smith wrote: "It has for some time past been the policy of Great Britain to discourage the consumption of spirituous liquors, on account of their supposed tendency to ruin the health and to corrupt the morals of the common people." Samuel Johnson was less flattering in his 1755 dictionary:

EXCI'SE. n.s. ... A hateful tax levied upon commodities, and adjudged not by the common judges of property, but wretches hired by those to whom excise is paid.

As a deterrent, excise is typically directed towards three broad categories of harm:

- health risks from abusing toxic substances (thus making it a kind of sumptuary tax); typically this includes tobacco and alcohol
- environmental damage (thus acting as a green tax); this usually includes fossil fuels (such as gasoline)
- socially damaging / morally objectionable activity (thus making it a type of vice tax or sin tax); usually this includes gambling, and can include prostitution (including solicitation and pimping) in places where it is legal

Revenue raised through excise may be earmarked for redress of specific social costs commonly associated with the product or service on which it is levied. Tobacco tax revenues, for example, might be spent on government anti-smoking campaigns, or healthcare for cancer, heart disease, vascular disease, lung disease, and so on.

In some countries, excise is also levied on some goods for purely punitive reasons. Many US states impose excise on illegal substances; these places do not consider it to be a revenue source, but instead regard it as a means of imposing a greater level of punishment, by opening up convicted criminals to the charge of tax evasion.

== Theoretical foundations on specific taxation ==
The economic analysis of excise taxes has its beginnings with Atkinson and Stiglitz in 1976 stating that if income taxes were optimal there would be no need for specific taxes. But, "if income taxation is not optimal, excise have a role to play, because they are relatively efficient sources of revenue, improve resource allocation by internalizing the external costs associated with the consumption or production of excisable products, discourage the consumption of products considered harmful, serve as a proxy for charging road users for the cost of government-provided services, or promote progressivity in taxation.". This is how Sijbren Cnossen sets out five main rationales for the use of excise duties:

1. Revenue-raising efficiency aspects. This is based on the classic argument of the "Ramsey rule". This means that in certain cases it is optimal to differentiate tax rates on consumption according to the price elasticity of each taxed good or service.
2. Externality-correcting issues. These are surcharges for the cost that consumers or producers of certain goods impose on society as a whole but which is not reflected in the price. In other words, there is a negative externality and, therefore, there must be a special tax that tries to correct it. Economically it means that "the marginal cost of an individual consumer or producer's action is less than the marginal cost of his action to society and, as a result, the individual engages in more of the activity than is socially optimal". It has its basis in Pigou's theory, a Pigouvian tax is a method that tries to internalize negative externalities to achieve the Nash equilibrium and optimal Pareto efficiency. The tax is normally set by the government to correct an undesirable or inefficient market outcome and does so by being set equal to the external marginal cost of the negative externalities.
3. Information failures and internality-correcting arguments. This refers to the fact that the lack of information or education about the consumption of certain harmful products has to be corrected by state intervention through the implementation of specific taxes. This is, for example, the case for alcohol, tobacco or sugary products. Because of the damage they cause to health and the illnesses they generate in people, it is decided to tax them specifically.
4. Benefit-charging features. This refers to specific taxes derived from the use of public infrastructures to cover the costs of their construction and maintenance. The clearest example is that of roads, where we find the consumption of road infrastructure, the environmental costs of its use, congestion costs referring to the cost of the added time imposed on drivers and the costs of accidents. This will be financed by specific taxes such as vehicle licensing, road tax, fuel taxes, etc.
5. Progressivity-enhancing aspects. Excise duties on high-value products, i.e. luxury goods, are included. In this way, the consumption of certain products that are only within the reach of high incomes is taxed, thus reinforcing a progressive tax system based on their consumption

== Targets of taxation ==
=== Tobacco, alcohol and gasoline ===
These are the three main targets of excise taxation in most countries around the world. They are everyday items of mass usage (even, arguably, "necessity") which bring significant revenue for governments. The first two are considered to be legal drugs, which are a cause of many illnesses (e.g. lung cancer, cirrhosis of the liver), which are used by large swathes of the population, both being widely recognized as addictive. Gasoline (or petrol), as well as diesel and certain other fuels, meanwhile, have excise tax imposed on them mainly because they pollute the environment and to raise funds to support the transportation infrastructure. Revenue-raising depends on a low responsiveness of consumption (elasticity) to tax-induced price changes and externality-prevention depends on the price responsiveness of specific users.

=== Cannabis ===
Following the legalization of non-medical cannabis in the United States, states with implemented legal markets have imposed new excise taxes on sales of cannabis products. These taxes have been used to build support for legalization initiatives by raising revenue for general spending purposes.

=== Narcotics ===
Some U.S. states tax transactions involving illegal drugs.

=== Gambling ===
Gambling licences are subject to excise in many countries today. In 18th-century England, and for a brief time in British North America, gambling itself was for a time also subject to taxation, in the form of stamp duty, whereby a revenue stamp had to be placed on the ace of spades in every pack of cards to demonstrate that the duty had been paid (hence the elaborate designs that evolved on this card in many packs as a result). Since stamp duty was originally only meant to be applied to documents (and cards were categorized as such), the fact that dice were also subject to stamp duty (and were in fact the only non-paper item listed under the Stamp Act 1765) suggests that its implementation to cards and dice can be viewed as a type of excise duty on gambling.

Profits of bookmakers are subject to General Betting Duty in the United Kingdom.

=== Prostitution ===
Prostitution has been proposed to bear excise tax in a campaign proposal by an opposition party in Canada (2005), and in a bill proposed in the Nevada Legislature (2009) – proposed wordings:

- "5.5 Implementation of an excise tax on prostitution, the brothel is taxed and passed it on." (Canada)
- "An excise tax is hereby imposed on each patron who uses the prostitution services of a prostitute in the amount of $5 for each calendar day or portion thereof that the patron uses the prostitution services of that prostitute." (Nevada)

=== Unhealthy products ===
Excise taxes on unhealthy products include specific taxes on calorie-dense and nutrient-poor food products that are harmful to health. As with environmental taxes, they are not intended to raise revenue but to modify consumer behaviour towards the consumption of food products that are healthy for human health. These include the taxation of specific products such as fast food or high-sugar beverages. For example, the World Health Organisation has indicated that the tax on sugary drinks would have to be at least 20% for this measure to have a real impact on obesity and cardiovascular disease. Countries that already have specific taxes on sugary drinks include Norway, Hungary, Finland and France. The introduction of these special taxes on unhealthy products not only has a short-term impact in terms of reducing consumption, but it is considered that in the long term it will also have positive effects on the welfare state of countries with public health. In other words, if society improves its consumption habits, it will be healthier in the future and diseases resulting from the consumption of unhealthy products will be prevented. This will reduce the need for medical services, which are financed by the state and therefore mean lower health care costs for governments.

=== Environmentally harmful products ===
In recent years, the creation or increase of excise taxes on certain existing consumer products whose production leads to environmental damage is being considered. The declaration of a climate emergency by international organisations such as the UN and the OECD warns that the current production model is and will have negative effects on life on the planet due to the current high level of pollution. This is why one way to internalise the negative externality derived from productive activity is the inclusion of special taxes on certain products that are the main cause. These include energy, hydrocarbons and certain means of transport. The aim is to reduce their consumption while at the same time generating revenue to mitigate the negative effects of their consumption. They are therefore excise taxes that serve purposes other than simply to raise revenue.

=== Other types ===
==== Salt, paper and coffee ====
One of the most notorious taxes in the whole of history was France's gabelle of salt. Although that was a sales tax, rather than an excise, salt has been subject to excise in some countries, along with many other substances which would, in today's world, seem rather unusual, such as paper, and coffee. In fact, salt was taxed as early as the second century, and as late as the twentieth.

Many different reasons have been given for the taxation of such substances, but have usually – if not explicitly – revolved around the historical scarcity of the substance, and their correspondingly high value at the time; governments clearly felt entitled to a share of the profits that traders made on them.

==== Window and related tax ====
Window tax was introduced as a form of income tax, that technically preserved the financial privacy of the individual, the rationale being that wealthier individuals would have grander homes, and hence would have more windows. Furthermore, unlike income, windows cannot be easily hidden. Taxes on the same principle include hearth tax, brick tax, and wallpaper tax. Excise is levied at the point of manufacture; in the case of hearth tax, and window tax, their status as excise therefore depends on whether the window/hearth can philosophically be said to truly exist before the hearth/window is installed in the property. Though technically excise, these taxes are really just substitutes for direct taxes, rather than being levied for the usual reasons for excise.

All of these taxes led to avoidance behaviour that had a substantial impact on society and architecture. People deliberately bricked up windows to avoid window tax, used much larger bricks to reduce their liability for brick tax, or bought plain paper and had it filled in later to avoid wallpaper tax. Some poor people even forced themselves to live in cold dark rooms in order to avoid paying these taxes. By contrast, extremely wealthy individuals would sometimes parade their ability to pay the tax, as a way of showing off their wealth, by flooding their properties with windows—even to the point of installing fake ones—using fine brickwork, covering their interiors with wallpaper, and having several fireplaces in each room.

==== Newspapers and advertising ====
Newspapers were taxed in the United Kingdom from 1712 until 1853. The original tax was increased with the Stamps Act 1814, when it was stipulated at 4d per copy. Since this made it extremely expensive for working-class families (doubling the price of a newspaper), it was pejoratively referred to as a "tax on knowledge", with people forced to rent newspapers on a per-hour basis, or else pool money together in order to buy and share. This resulted in a situation where even out-of-date newspapers were widely sought after.

Advertisement Duty was also stipulated in the same laws and was also charged on a "per unit" basis, irrespective of the size or nature of the advertisement. Until 1833 the cost was 3s 6d, after which it was reduced to 1s 6d.

== Machinery of implementation ==
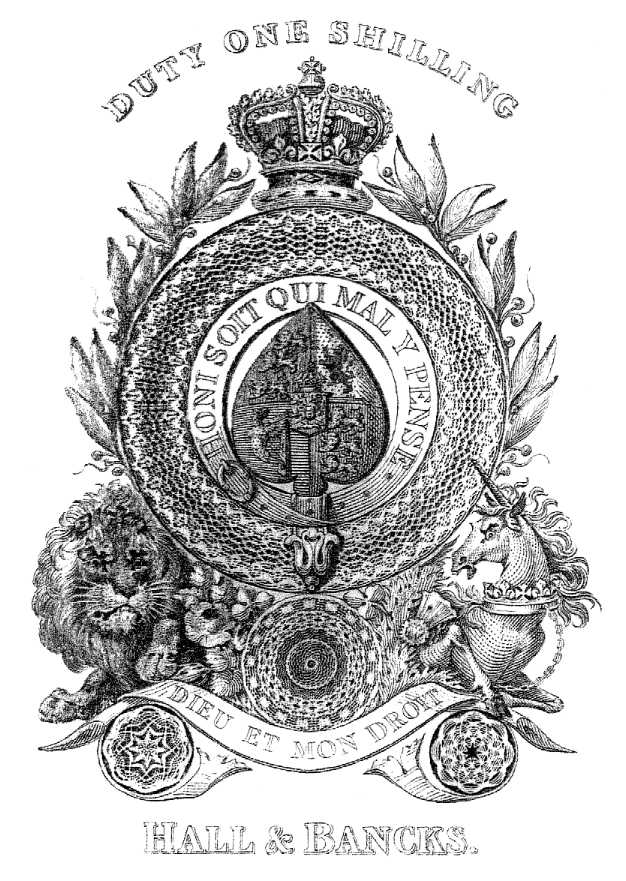
1828 "Old Frizzle"

An excise duty is often applied by the affixation of revenue stamps to the products being sold. In the case of tobacco or alcohol, for example, producers may be given (or required to buy) a certain bulk amount of excise stamps from the government and are then obliged to affix one to every packet of cigarettes or bottle of spirits produced.

One of the most noticeable examples of this is the development of the Ace of Spades as a particularly elaborate card, from the time when it was obliged to carry the stamp for playing card duty.

A government-owned monopoly—such as an alcohol monopoly—is another method of ensuring the excise is paid.

Adam Smith noted that an excise may be imposed either while a product "remain[s] in the hands of the dealer, and before [it is] delivered to the consumer", or while in the hands of the consumer "on account of his using or consuming" it; in the latter case, the excise may be imposed as an "annual sum", for which Smith cited a "plate tax" and a "coach tax" as examples. Justice William Paterson quoted Smith in reasoning that a tax on carriages was an excise.

== Around the world ==
General government revenue, in % of GDP, from excises. For this data, the variance of GDP per capita with purchasing power parity (PPP) is explained in 2% by tax revenue.

=== Australia ===
The Australian Taxation Office describes an excise as "a tax levied on certain types of goods produced or manufactured in Australia. These... include alcohol, tobacco and petroleum and alternative fuels".

In Australia, the meaning of "excise" is not merely academic, but has been the subject of numerous court cases. The High Court of Australia has repeatedly held that a tax can be an "excise" regardless of whether the taxed goods are of domestic or foreign origin; most recently, in Ha v New South Wales (1997), the majority of the Court endorsed the view that an excise is "an inland tax on a step in production, manufacture, sale or distribution of goods", and took a wide view of the kind of "step" which, if subject to a tax, would make the tax an excise.

=== Canada ===
Excise taxes in Canada are an important source of revenue for the federal government. They are used to raise revenue and discourage Canadian citizens to use or consume harmful goods like alcohol or tobacco. Excise taxes in Canada date back to the 17th century when the French colonial government imposed a tax on fur trading to raise revenue for building infrastructure. Later the British colonies added taxes on tobacco, alcohol, sugar and tea. Today the types of taxes imposed by the federal government vary but most notable ones could be broken down in these three categories:

- Alcohol Tax: There is an excise tax on beer ($37.01 per hectolitre), wine ($0.731 per litre) and spirits ($13.864 per litre of absolute ethyl alcohol)
- Tobacco Tax: The federal excise tax on cigarettes is $0.79162 per 5 cigarettes. There are also excise duties on tobacco sticks, cigars, and cannabis (which is legalized in Canada).
- Fuel Tax: There is a tax for certain petroleum products, fuel inefficient vehicles, and air conditioners. Most importantly tax for fuels like diesel fuel ($0.04 per litre), unleaded gasoline ($0.10) or aviation fuel ($0.04)

However, there are small adjustments to these excise duties that vary from province to province.

=== China ===
In China excise tax is levied both on production and on the sale of a certain goods or services. Excise taxes have been present in China since the Ming and Qing dynasties, but they were only imposed on goods like tea or silk which was considered to more of a luxury goods. In modern China this was largely expanded to excise duties on alcohol, tobacco, petroleum or telecommunication. Examples of China's excise taxes would be:

- Alcohol Tax: The taxes for alcohol vary depending on the type of alcohol and its alcohol content.
- Fuel Tax: In China tax on fuels differs for every type of fuel. For instance, the excise tax on gasoline is 1.52 yuan per liter and for diesel is 1.2 yuan per liter.
- Tobacco Tax: The tax on tobacco is actually ad valorem tax meaning that it's based on the retail price of the item rather than quantity. For example, the tax on cigarettes ranges from 5-56 % depending on the cigarettes type. Other than that, there is also a VAT tax on cigarettes (13%). This could be explained by the efforts of the Chinese government to reduce smoking and increase public health.

There are many more goods that are subject to excise taxes like cars, other motor vehicles and luxury goods. Excise taxes in general have been heavily criticized for being regressive (disproportionate on lower income citizens) so the government has undertaken steps to better the situation like increasing taxes on luxury cars.

=== European Union ===
In the European Union, harmonisation of excise duties has been considered from the outset. However, the first obstacle was the great heterogeneity of these taxes in the different Member States. Excise duty was introduced in the European Union by the Council Directive 92/12/EEC of 25 February 1992 on the general arrangements for products subject to excise duty and on the holding, movement and monitoring of such products, which came into force on 1 January 1993 with the advent of the single market. This directive was repealed and replaced on 1 April 2010 by the Council directive 2008/118/EC of 16 December 2008 concerning the general arrangements for excise duty and repealing directive 92/12/EEC. Under the directive, the following products are subject to excise duty:

- mineral oils;
- alcohol and alcoholic beverages;
- manufactured tobacco.

In addition, the directive allows Member States to apply excise duties to products other than those mentioned above, provided that such taxation does not give rise to border-crossing formalities. Due to the differences between countries and the impossibility of reaching an agreement whereby the tax would be fixed and the same for all member countries, it was decided to intervene in excise duties in two ways. The first by establishing a minimum tax rate equal for all member countries and, secondly, by establishing a long-term objective to which all member countries should converge.

Excise duty does not become chargeable until the excisable products leave the tax warehouse and are removed from the associated suspension arrangements. However, to avoid excise duty being levied (and possibly reimbursed) each time goods are moved in the course of trade, the directive also provides for a system of movement under a suspension arrangement. Under this system, excisable goods can be dispatched from one tax warehouse to another without excise duty being charged. Products move between tax warehouses under cover of an accompanying administrative document (AAD), which is stamped by customs in the country of departure and by customs in the country of arrival, from where it is returned to the issuer. These days, movements are tracked electronically via the Community's electronic Excises Movements Control System (EMCS).

The directive also stipulates that private individuals may pay excise duty in the country in which they buy the products, provided that they transport them themselves. Furthermore, in order to prevent fraudulent trafficking, the directive also establishes that the holding of excisable products for commercial purposes in one country gives rise to the levying of excise duty there, even if the tax had already been paid in another country. To determine what is meant by commercial purposes, the directive sets out various criteria, including the quantity of products held. Finally, the directive clearly states that in the case of distance selling to private individuals, excise duty is payable in the country of arrival. In such cases, the vendor is in principle obliged to pay the tax in that country, even if they are not established there.

Lastly, the directive also provides for exemptions for products intended for delivery:

- within the framework of diplomatic and consular relations (diplomatic allowances),
- international organisations recognised by the host Member State,
- NATO forces

On the understanding that Member States are free to set rates higher than the minimum rates, specific directives for each countries can be done on:

- energy products and electricity;
- alcohol and alcoholic beverages;
- manufactured tobacco.

According to Eurostat data from 2014, it is known that energy taxes represent on average 16% of the implicit rate on consumption and up to 50% of excise tax revenue. Alcohol and tobacco account for only 8% of the implicit rate on consumption. As a whole, excise duties account for around 3% of GDP as a weighted average for the countries that make up the European Union.

=== France ===
In France, the domestic consumption tax on energy products (TICPE) and the tax on tobacco and alcohol are excise duties. They are collected by customs, as is dock dues in overseas departments.

In France, the transport of alcohol (or tobacco and other products subject to this tax) in excess of a relatively small quantity, even by private individuals for their own consumption, is subject to this tax (also known as "excise duty") for example, for the transport of alcohol in casks (this tax may be levied when crossing a border, where the quantity of alcohol above a certain level will be paid to the customs authorities). It is this notion of a threshold on the quantity transported (and not the actual use to which it will be put) that makes it possible to presume and differentiate between personal possession and commercial use (and this tax must be paid before transport, even in the case of a purchase with invoice in a large retail outlet intended for private individuals, This tax must be paid before the vehicle is transported, even if the vehicle is purchased with an invoice from a large retail outlet for private use. Few people are aware of this, but it can be fined or seized if the "tax stamp" (represented by the tax capsule known as the "CRD" or "capsule représentative de droit") is not produced when the vehicle is inspected by a customs service anywhere in the country, not just at borders, or even if the vehicle is found to have been transported by a police or gendarmerie service during any official inspection or report in the event of a road traffic offence or an accident, whether at fault or not.) It is the driver of the vehicle who must justify this tax at the time of transport, or the company employing the driver if the vehicle is used for professional purposes.

Additional taxes (similar to excise duties) are levied in France:

- on spirits with a high alcoholic strength (over 18 degrees), mixed drinks containing more than 1% alcohol ("premix") and on tobacco, for the direct benefit of health insurance funds,
- on drinking water supplied by operators of public concessions (the excise duty is then paid by the operator to the public basin agency and/or the local authority),
- on boreholes drilled by private individuals (digging wells for example) or certain installations requiring authorisation and regular monitoring (such as private wastewater treatment installations), the monitoring of which is the responsibility of the basin agencies for the preservation of drinking water resources, these taxes being collected by the tax authorities before the construction permit is issued,
- on tree felling in private areas of protected forests (this tax may be offset by replanting programmes), or indirectly by the tax authorities on behalf of third parties:
- on all electronic products or products that are difficult to reprocess because of their environmental toxicity and non-degradability (commonly known as the "ecotax"), for the benefit of a fund to finance their recycling and research in this field,
- on passenger air transport, for the benefit of an international development fund,
- on digital or analogue data carriers that allow replication (magnetic tapes, hard disks, physical recording media and all non-volatile memories) to a fund for artists and media producers (music publishing, films, books, software) intended to offset the legal right to private copying.

=== Germany ===
Excise taxes in Germany are an important source of government revenue. They are levied on a variety of goods and serve to improve public health, promote environmental protection and fund social programs. The rates of these taxes are often adjusted to ensure they are achieving their goals. In Germany, the following excise is charged:

- energy:
  - gasoline: €0.6545 /l (c. €0.073 /kWh)
  - diesel: €0.4704 /l (c. €0.047 /kWh)
  - LPG: €0.166 /kg (c. €0.0896 /l or €0.0129 /kWh)
  - CNG: €0.1803 /kg (c. €0.0139 /kWh)
  - heating oil: €0.13 /kg (c. €0.0119 /kWh)
- electricity:
  - default: €0.0205 /kWh
  - for trains, trams, etc.: €0.01142 /kWh
- nuclear fuel:
  - €145 /g
- intermediate products in production of alcoholic beverages:
  - default: €1.53 /l
  - alcoholic contents < 15%: €1.02 /l
  - intermediate products in champagne production: €1.36 /l
- tobacco:
  - cigarettes: €0.0982 /cigarette + 21.69% of the retail price
  - pipe tobacco: €15.66 /kg + 13.13% of the gross price
  - cigars: €0.014 /cigar + 1.47% of the gross price
- coffee:
  - roasted: €2.19 /kg
  - instant: €4.78 /kg
- beer: c. €0.094 /l, depends on the type of beer
- spirits
- champagne:
  - alcoholic contents < 6%: €0.51 /l
  - alcoholic contents >= 6%: €1.36 /l
- alcopops: €0.0555 /l pure alcohol

=== India ===
In India, almost all products are subject to excise duty, provided the following four conditions are fulfilled:

- There should be a manufacture
- The manufacture was in India (excluding special economic zone)
- The manufacture should result in goods
- The goods thus manufactured must be excisable (means the goods must be specified in central excise tariff act, 1985)

The excise tax in India is imposed typically on production and manufacturing rather than on sale of goods and services. This means that the taxes are paid by the manufacturer, but it is the consumer who ultimately bears the burden of the tax. India has also incorporated a system which allows companies to pay this tax monthly using the online ACES (Automation of Central Excise and Service Tax) portal. Taxes here are mostly calculated as ad valorem taxes although there are some special cases where rates are applied. The first ever excise taxes were introduced during the British colonial era in mid-19th century to generate revenue by taxing commercial products. Then after gaining independence in 1947, it has undergone many changes and today it is using the Goods and Services tax (GST) system introduced in 2017. Excise taxes in India could be broken down into these main categories:

- Basic Excise Duty (BED): This tax is calculated as a percentage of the estimated value of goods, and it is levied on production in India.
- Additional Excise Duty (AED): This tax is also calculated as a percentage of the assessed value and it is levied on products such as tobacco, pan masala or aerated water.
- Special Excise Duty (SED): This tax is levied on goods like alcohol, petroleum products or tobacco and it is also charged as a percentage of the goods value.

There are also a few more categories like Service tax or education cess. However, a lot of these taxes have been subsumed in the Goods and services tax.

=== Indonesia ===
In Indonesia, tobacco products (including electronic cigarettes) and alcoholic drinks are subject to excise duties. Sweetened drinks and plastic bags will be subject to excise duties starting in 2024.

=== Japan ===
Excise taxes in Japan are a type of consumption taxes that are imposed on certain goods and services at the time of purchase. The main goal of excise taxes in Japan is to discourage people from using harmful products or buying luxury items. Japan has been implementing excise taxes since the mid-19th century when it needed the money for their rapid modernizing and growth. For example, one of the earliest excise taxes on tobacco were imposed in 1898 and this helped to raise funds for the Russo-Japanese War. Today most of the excise taxes in Japan are replaced by the consumption tax. The consumption tax rate is at 10% since 2019, however it is imposed on variety of products and there are exceptions in the rates for goods like alcohol, tobacco or fuel.

=== United Kingdom ===
In the United Kingdom, the following forms of excise are levied on goods and services:

- Air Passenger Duty (Finance Act 1994)
- Aggregates Levy (Finance Act 2001)
- Alcohol duties (Beer Duty, Wine Duty, Cider Duty, Spirits Duty) (Alcoholic Liquor Duties Act 1979)
- Bingo Duty (Betting and Gaming Duties Act 1981)
- Climate Change Levy (Finance Act 2000)
- Gambling duties (General Betting Duty, Pool Betting Duty, Remote Gaming Duty) (Finance Act 2014)
- HGV Road User Levy (HGV Road User Levy Act 2013)
- Hydrocarbon Oil Duty (Hydrocarbon Oil Duties Act 1979)
- Landfill tax (Finance Act 1996)
- Machine Games Duty (Finance Act 2012) (formerly Amusement Machine Licence Duty)
- Tobacco Duty (Tobacco Products Duty Act 1979)
- Vehicle Excise Duty (Vehicle Excise and Registration Act 1994)

Excise tax is an indirect tax created in the United Kingdom during the First English Revolution, also known as "stamp duty", which has been applied to a wide range of products, particularly imports. Historically, it was collected by the Board of Excise, which was subsequently combined with the Inland Revenue (responsible for collecting direct taxes). In view of the higher likelihood of organised crime being involved in attempts at evading Excise, and its association with smuggling, compared with evasion attempts concerning direct taxation, the Board of Excise was later combined instead with the Board of Customs, to form HM Customs and Excise. In this combined form, Customs and Excise was responsible for managing the import and export of goods and services into the UK, and its officers wielded greater powers of access, arrest, and seizure, than the Police.

On 18 April 2005, Customs and Excise was merged once more with the Inland Revenue to form a new department, HM Revenue and Customs (HMRC). The enormous contrast between the powers of officers of the Inland Revenue, and those of Customs and Excise, initially caused several difficulties in the early life of the new organisation. Many of the monitoring and inspection functions, and corresponding powers, were later split off to form a new UK Border Agency, while the residual organisation is now merely responsible for the financial aspects of collection.

=== United States ===
In the United States, the term "excise" has at least two meanings: (A) any tax other than a property tax or capitation (i.e., an excise is an indirect tax in the constitutional law sense), or (B) a tax that is simply called an excise in the language of the statute imposing that tax (an excise in the statutory law sense, sometimes called a "miscellaneous excise"). An excise under definition (A) is not necessarily the same as an excise under definition (B).

An excise (under definition B) has been defined as '"a tax upon manufacture, sale or for a business license or charter, as distinguished from a tax on real property, income or estates."

Both the federal and state governments levy excise taxes on goods such as alcohol, motor fuel, and tobacco products. The laws of the federal government and of some state governments impose excises known as the income tax. Even though federal excise taxes are geographically uniform, state excise taxes vary considerably. Taxation constitutes a substantial proportion of the retail prices on alcohol and tobacco products.

Local governments may also impose an excise tax. For example, the city of Anchorage, Alaska charges a cigarette tax of $1.30 per pack, which is on top of the federal excise tax and the state excise tax. In 2011, the United States federal excise tax on gasoline was 18.4 cents per gallon (4.86 ¢/L) and 24.4 cents per gallon (6.45 ¢/L) for diesel fuel.

== Criticisms ==
Critics of excise have interpreted and described it as simply being a way for government to levy further and unnecessary taxation on the population. The presence of refunds of duty under the UK's list of excisable activities has been used to support this argument, as it results in taxation being implemented on persons even when they would normally be exempt from paying other types of taxes (the reason they qualify for the refund in the first place).

Furthermore, excise sometimes doubles up with other taxes, and in particular with customs duties (except, for duty-free items). If a good is purchased in one country and later exported to another, excise must be paid when it was manufactured, and customs then paid when it enters the second country; in a sense, the "creation" of the good has been taxed twice, although from the second country's point of view, it only came into existence as a taxable good at the border.

In some countries, such as the UK, excise has generally been limited to goods which are luxuries or a risk to health or morals, but this is not the case everywhere. Taxation on medicines, pharmaceuticals and medical equipment has been an issue of contention, especially in developing countries, due to the fact that this can cause the prices of medicines, and medical procedures, to become inflated, even when potentially lifesaving; this has sometimes forced healthcare providers to limit the number of operations performed.

In some countries, goods which are illegal are nevertheless also subject to excise, and the ground of tax evasion has subsequently been used to prosecute criminal gang leaders, when it has not been possible to prosecute the criminal activity more directly. It has also been argued that, by taxing banned substances, some US states are able to gain additional revenues. In some cases, legislation creates an incentive for the state to turn a blind eye to certain criminal activity, by allowing dealers to preserve their anonymity, and thus enabling revenue to be collected without leading to the arrest of the perpetrator:

A dealer is not required to give his/her name or address when purchasing stamps and the Department is prohibited from sharing any information relating to the purchase of drug tax stamps with law enforcement or anyone else.

== See also ==
- Securities turnover excise tax
- Tax
