= Indirect tax =

Type of tax

An indirect tax (such as a sales tax, per unit tax, value-added tax (VAT), excise tax, consumption tax, or tariff) is a tax that is levied upon goods and services before they reach the customer who ultimately pays the indirect tax as a part of market price of the good or service purchased. Alternatively, if the entity who pays taxes to the tax collecting authority does not suffer a corresponding reduction in income, i.e., the effect and tax incidence are not on the same entity meaning that tax can be shifted or passed on, then the tax is indirect.

An indirect tax is collected by an intermediary (such as a retail store) from the person (such as the consumer) who pays the tax included in the price of a purchased good. The intermediary later files a tax return and forwards the tax proceeds to government with the return. In this sense, the term indirect tax is contrasted with a direct tax, which is collected directly by government from the persons (legal or natural) on whom it is imposed. Some commentators have argued that "a direct tax is one that cannot be charged by the taxpayer to someone else, whereas an indirect tax can be."

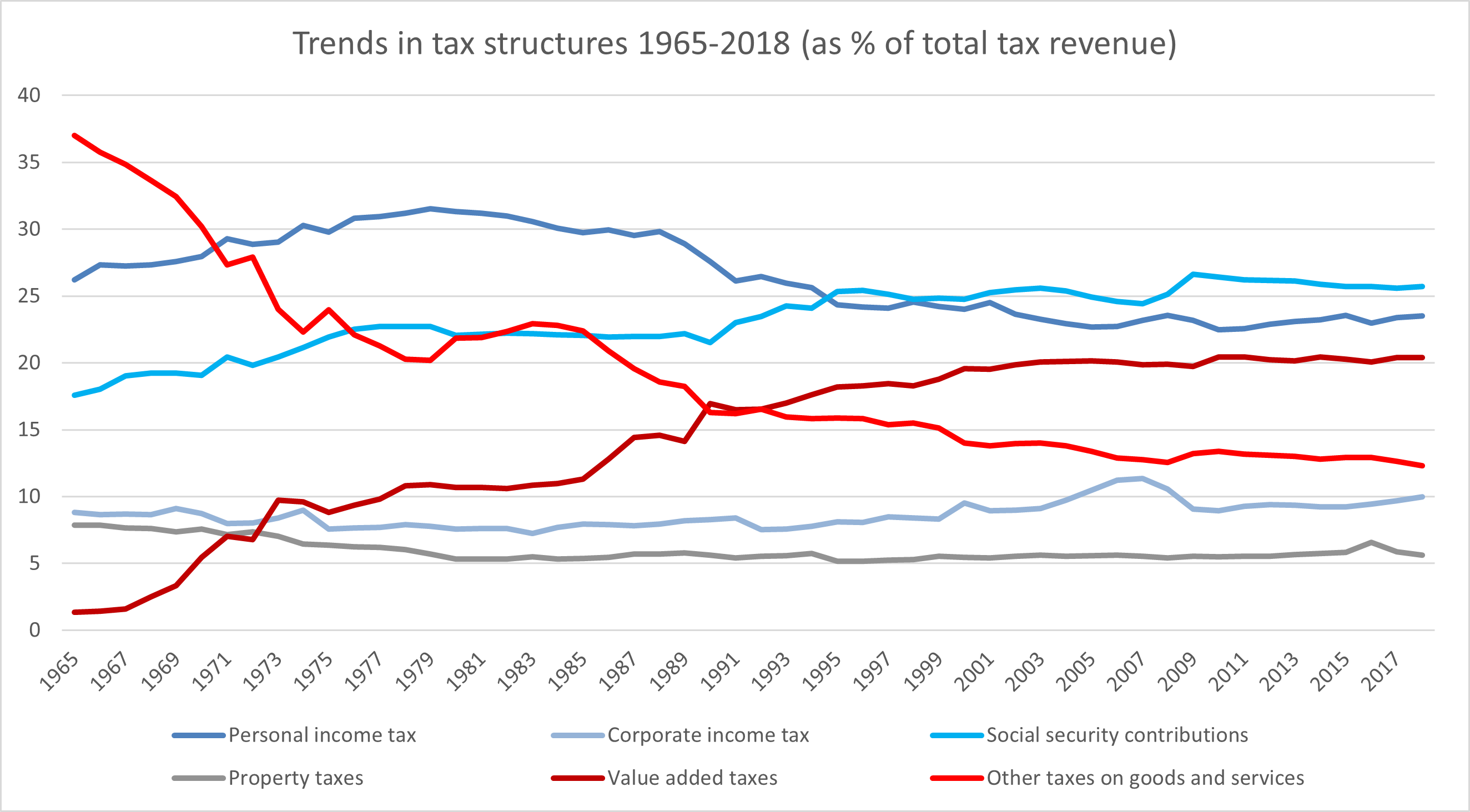
Trends in Tax Structures in OECD Countries

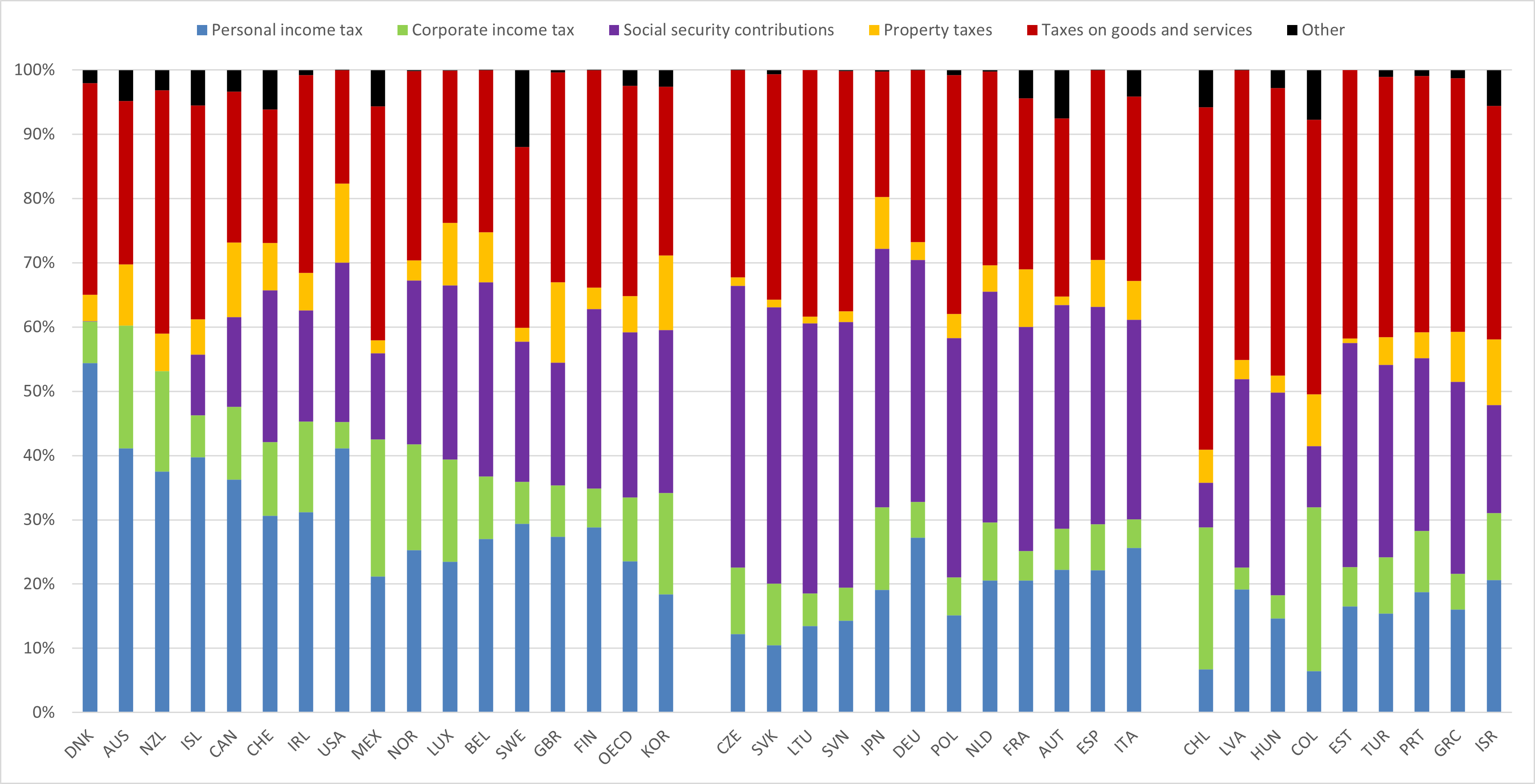
Tax structure per OECD country in 2018.

Indirect taxes constitute a significant proportion of total tax revenue raised by the government. Data published by OECD show that the average indirect tax share of total tax revenue for all member countries in 2018 was 32.7% with standard deviation 7.9%. The member country with the highest share was Chile with 53.2% and at the other end was USA with 17.6%. The general trend in direct vs indirect tax ratio in total tax revenue over past decades in developed countries shows an increase in direct tax share of total tax revenue. Although this trend is also observed in developing countries, the trend is less pronounced there than in developed countries.

Indirect taxes have several uses, the most prominent one (same as for direct taxes) is to raise government revenue. Sales tax and value-added tax (VAT) play the major role in this, with VAT being more commonly used around the world. The distinction between these two taxes is that sales tax is paid by the customer at the moment of purchase of the final good or service, whereas VAT is a multistage tax imposed on goods and services that is collected in parts at each stage of production and distribution of goods and services in proportion to the value added by each taxpaying entity.

Apart from the role in raising government revenue, indirect taxes, in the form of tariffs and import duties, are also used to regulate quantity of imports and exports flowing in and out of the country. In case of imports, by tariff imposition the government protects domestic producers from foreign producers that may have lower production costs, and thus are able to sell their goods and services at lower prices, driving domestic producers out of the market. After tariff imposition, imported goods become more expensive for domestic consumers, hence domestic producers are better-off than before tariff imposition.

Furthermore, indirect taxes in the form of excise taxes are used to reduce the consumption of goods and services that create negative externalities. For instance, an excise tax imposed on a pack of cigarettes increases the price of cigarettes, which leads to decreased consumption of cigarettes, which leads to the reduction of health conditions caused by smoking and second-hand smoking. Moreover, the tax discourages the youth from taking up smoking as they have quite elastic price elasticity of cigarette demand.

The concept of value-added tax (VAT) as an indirect tax was the brainchild of a German industrialist, Dr. Wilhelm von Siemens in 1918. A hundred years later, the tax which was devised to be efficient and relatively simple to collect and enforce is, together with the goods and services tax (GST), now in place in over 140 countries globally.

General government revenue, in % of GDP, from indirect taxes. For this data, the variance of GDP per capita with purchasing power parity (PPP) is explained in 0 % by tax revenue.

== Characteristics of indirect taxes ==
Tax incidence of indirect taxes is not clear, in fact, statutory (legal) incidence in most cases tells us nothing about economic (final) incidence. The incidence of indirect tax imposed on a good or service depends on price elasticity of demand (PED) and price elasticity of supply (PES) of a concerned good or service. In case the good has an elastic demand and inelastic supply, the tax burden falls mainly on the producer of the good, whereas the burden of the good with an inelastic demand and elastic supply falls mainly on consumers. The only case when the burden of indirect tax falls totally on consumers, i.e., statutory and economic incidence are the same, is when the supply of a good is perfectly elastic and its demand is perfectly inelastic, which is, however, a very rare case. The shifting of the tax incidence may be both intentional and unintentional. In fact, economic subject may shift the tax burden to other economic subject by changing their market behavior. For example, tax imposed on the output of a firm's good may lead to higher consumer prices, reduced wages paid to firm's employees and reduced returns to firm's owners and shareholders or reduced supply of the good on the market, or any combination of mentioned consequences.

Indirect taxes have a substantial regressive effect on the distribution of income since indirect tax is usually imposed on goods and services irrespective of consumer's income. In practice, the effective indirect tax rate is higher for individuals with lower income, meaning that an individual with lower income spends on a good or service higher proportion of their income than an individual with higher income. For example, consider a good with $100 sales tax imposed on it. An individual with the income $10,000 pays 1% of their income as the tax while a poorer individual with income $5,000 pays 2% of their income. Moreover, the regressivity of indirect tax systems affects the total progressivity of tax systems of countries given the importance of indirect tax revenues in government budget and the degree of regressivity of the indirect tax system, which ranges among countries. Furthermore, the extent of regressive nature of an indirect tax depends on the type of indirect tax. Empirical evidence suggests that excise taxes are in general more regressive than VAT. This could be attributed to the fact that excise taxes are levied on goods such as alcohol, tobacco, and these goods comprise a higher share of budgets among poorer households, while at the same time, poorer households are likely to consume goods with reduced VAT rates given that in some countries there is a VAT deduction on necessities such as food and medicine. As a result of the regressive nature of indirect taxes and the fact that they tend to be unresponsive to economic conditions, they cannot act as automatic stabilizers within the economy, unlike some of direct taxes.

Indirect taxes, specifically excise taxes, are attractive because they have a corrective nature. Such taxes raise revenue and at the same time they correct a market failure through increasing price of the good and thus decreasing its consumption. Therefore, less revenue needs to be raised through other taxes, which could be more distortionary, to cover the market failure. The economy benefits from the reduced extent of the negative externality and from lower reliance on other taxes that distort production. Apart from generating revenue and reducing the consumption of goods creating negative externalities, excise taxes can be tailored to impose tax burdens on those who cause the negative externality or those who benefit from government services. Examples are petrol tax, argued to be user fees for the government provided roads, and tobacco tax, imposed on smokers who through smoking create a negative externality of consumption. The design of such excise tax determines the consequences. Two main types of excise taxes are specific tax (tax imposed as fixed amount of money per unit) and ad valorem tax (tax imposed as the percentage of the price of a good). Specific and ad valorem taxes have identical consequences in competitive markets apart from differences in compliance and enforcement. As for imperfectly competitive markets, such as the cigarette market, ad valorem taxes are arguably better as they automatically produce higher per-unit taxes when firms reduce production to increase prices, whereas specific taxes need to be readjusted in this case, which is administratively and legislatively difficult process.

Moreover, indirect taxes are usually associated with relatively lower administrative costs than direct taxes. In general, the administrative costs of tax system are determined by its complexity, and most costs associated with administering come from special provisions such as deductibility of certain categories of expenditures, which is typical for direct taxes such as personal and corporate income taxes. The indirect evidence may be drawn from the fact that developing countries have significantly lower direct-to-indirect tax ratio than developed countries given that choice of tax mix in developing countries is mainly based on administration and capacity issues. Developing countries used to heavily rely on trade taxes collected at centralized ports of entry into the country, which is associated with the relatively low cost of collection and enforcement. The relative importance of trade taxes in developing countries in recent years is on decrease due to trade liberalization, however, the drop of importance of indirect taxes in developing countries was partially offset by increases in the relative importance of domestic consumption taxes such as VAT. Empirical evidence suggests that income levels are associated with reduced reliance on expenditure taxes, countries with larger government size are more likely to rely more on direct taxes and that the countries prefer to use taxes for which there are relatively large tax bases available. At the same time, developing countries tend to have lower government size, which restricts them to have a more complex and efficient tax system, lower income levels in the country, and it is more practical for them to focus on taxing larger tax bases due to its lower administrative costs. Furthermore, different types of indirect taxes differ in terms of administrative costs. VAT, in which the large proportion of the revenue is generated by large corporations responsible for large part of the economy's values added has lower administrative costs than sales tax, in which the tax is imposed only at the final level in countless retail outlets of various sizes. Moreover, VAT is associated with relatively low administrative costs due to lower enforcement and collection costs due to the fact that VAT is collected throughout the production chain, which allows for the comparison of reported sales on each stage of the vertical production chain by the fiscal authority.

== "Indirect tax" in the U.S. constitutional law sense ==
The term indirect tax has a different meaning in the context of American Constitutional law: see direct tax and excise tax in the United States. In the United States, the federal income tax has been, since its inception on 1 July 1862, an indirect tax (more specifically an excise). During the 1940s, its application grew from a historical average of about 8% to around 90% of the population paying it as a measure to support the war effort.

== The difference between direct tax and indirect tax ==
The main criterion to distinguish between direct tax and indirect tax is whether the tax burden can be passed on. Indirect taxes are levied on goods and services. They only indirectly target the public. With the circulation of goods, most of the turnover tax will be passed on to subsequent links. It is in this sense that the economist Mueller said: "(Indirect tax) ostensibly imposes this kind of tax on someone, but in fact, that person can be compensated by damaging the interests of another person." Below, income tax and property tax, this kind of tax that cannot or is inconvenient for taxpayers to transfer the tax burden to others, are all typical direct taxes. Income tax includes personal income tax, corporate income tax, etc., and property tax includes property tax and inheritance tax, social security tax, etc.

It is not difficult to see that the taxpayer of direct tax is also the actual payer of the tax. To a large extent, a direct tax is a direct deprivation of citizens' property rights, and its collection can more arouse citizens' feeling of "tax pain". Taxpayers of indirect taxes are not taxpayers. Consumers who pay for indirect taxes are often placed in the status of "vegetative" in the law and are not sensitive to their own taxpayer's rights, and the feeling of "tax pain" is not strong. . This largely explains why the actual burden on farmers is still not light after China's abolition of the agricultural tax. This is due to the increase in the cost of fertilizers and seeds. Farmers still have to pay for them, which has become the ultimate "negative tax" in the national tax system. "People" are related. Regarding this issue, Western countries do not include tax in the price of goods but list the tax separately on the consumption bill. The price is the price, and the tax is the tax so that consumers can clearly be taxpayers.

== The development of indirect taxes ==
After the financial crisis, the governments of many countries still have strong funding needs. Whether it is financing the economic stimulus plan or gradually making up for the funding gap caused by the economic shock, indirect taxes have proven to be the first choice for income generation for many years and will continue to be so in the future. The large number of advocates who promote the shift from direct to indirect taxes can explain this trend, such as the International Monetary Fund (IMF), the Organization for Economic Cooperation and Development (OECD), and the European Commission. Some international studies have shown that value-added tax (VAT) has the least effect on economic growth, while corporate income tax has a negative effect on economic growth.

Another important reason for this sustained development is that in the context of international tax competition and economic weakness, it is not allowed to levy more and more corporate or personal income taxes. Indirect taxes, by definition, are borne by consumers, do not depend on profits, and are limited by the economic situation. Indirect taxes mainly generate more income in three ways:

- Expansion of value-added tax or consumption tax system

According to the OECD's "Consumption Tax Trends, 2014", as of 1 January 2014, 164 countries in the world have levied value-added tax, of which Africa accounts for 46 countries, North America 1 and Central America and the Caribbean There are 12 in South America, 28 in Asia, 51 in Europe, and 8 in Oceania. As a result, only a few countries have levied a retail tax, which is a tax on a single link of goods and services borne by the final consumer.

In addition, the number of countries with "value-added tax" continues to grow, especially in emerging economies. On 1 January 2005, the Bahamas introduced a value-added tax. On 1 April 2015, Malaysia introduced a value-added tax to replace the existing sales and service tax. Egypt introduced a value-added tax law that will replace the existing general sales tax system. The tax reform plan entrusted by the Puerto Rico government to the research team will increase general fund revenue, simplify overall compliance and promote economic growth.

- The increase in the value-added tax rate of consumption tax

In countries that have already levied value-added tax/consumption tax, the average tax rate is increasing year by year, and this trend will continue. This upward trend is particularly significant in Europe and OECD countries, where the average standard value-added rate has reached 21.6% (EU member states) and 19.2% (OECD member states), while only 19.5% and 17.5% before 2008 economic crisis. Average. Compared with previous years, European tax rates started to be surprisingly stable in 2015, although tax rates are still at a high level. Iceland reduced the standard tax rate from 25.5% to 24% (and the tax rebate rate increased from 7% to 11%), but some countries' tax rates are increasing. Luxembourg's standard tax rate has increased from 15% to 17%. The main reason for the increase. And more countries will join the ranks of raising tax rates: Italy is considering raising tax rates, and Portugal may follow suit.

- The growth of consumption tax

The increase in higher indirect tax revenue is due to the truly global trend of increased consumption taxes. Tobacco excise taxes will increase in many countries, including Denmark, Ecuador, Finland, Ghana, Malta, Ireland, the Netherlands, Norway, Russia, Slovenia, Sweden, and Tanzania. The countries that have increased the consumption tax on alcohol are Lithuania, Norway, and Tanzania. In addition, mineral oil consumption taxes have increased in China, Estonia, Finland, Gambia, Hungary, Norway, and Russia. Not only is the tax rate increasing, but the government is also levying new taxes. For example, a relatively new trend is the collection of excise taxes on health-related products (non-alcoholic beverages and tobacco products), such as fast food taxes and sugar taxes on "unhealthy" foods. In many countries, expenditures on health and welfare may be linked to taxes, and as the population ages and the pressure to increase government spending in these areas increases, these taxes may become more common.

In addition, the government is also trying to increase taxation on financial transactions, although this is not an international practice. Some countries have also strengthened the supervision and management of the banking industry. In Europe, the preferred method is to impose a financial transaction tax. France introduced a financial transaction tax in August 2012, and Hungary implemented a 1% tax on paid services in January 2013. Italy subsequently imposed taxes on equity transfer derivatives and high-frequency trading in March 2013. However, 11 EU countries that will impose daily transaction taxes on stock and bond exchanges and derivative contract schemes (FTT) have further delayed their taxation. The 11 member states participating in the meeting have agreed to impose this tax in January 2016.

== Indirect taxes are adapting to new economic conditions ==
One of the characteristics of indirect taxes is that they are very closely related to economic conditions. Indirect taxes are usually subject to economic transactions, such as the sale of goods or the provision of labor services. Once the nature of these transactions or the method of transactions changes, indirect taxes will quickly be greatly affected.

To give an example that clearly undermines the indirect tax system is the rise of e-commerce. E-commerce can be defined as products or services that are traded through the Internet. Since the 1990s, the Internet has been widely used, and the world has become a "click" world. This change has had a huge effect on consumer behavior, because it allows consumers to buy all kinds of goods online without leaving home, and then allows them to purchase from abroad those already expropriated in China. Value-added tax services are used to avoid tax burdens. In the past few years, e-commerce has been the fastest growing in many countries.

Such an important development means a huge change: it will cause distortions in competition between local and foreign suppliers and will have a major effect on VAT revenue, especially when it involves sales to end consumers (i.e. B2C transactions). The international community responded quickly to this new reality, and in 1998, the OECD member states unanimously adopted the "Ottawa Taxation Framework Conditions" on e-commerce taxation:

- The rules of consumption tax for cross-border trade should be determined by the taxation of the jurisdiction where the consumption occurs.
- The international community should reach a consensus on supply and consumption in a jurisdiction.
- For the purpose of consumption tax, the supply of digital products should not be regarded as a commodity supply.
- For these enterprises to obtain services and intangible property from foreign suppliers, the state should check the use of reverse charging, self-assessment, or other equivalent institutions.
- The country should formulate a corresponding system to collect taxes on imported goods, and such a system should not hinder taxation, and can provide consumers with high-quality and efficient products.

However, in most countries, there is no complete and unified plan for the collection of e-commerce taxes. In recent years, governments all over the world have realized that incomplete legislation has brought a huge loss of fiscal revenue, and have begun to actively implement new rules.

Recent examples of how the digital economy affects value-added tax laws include the EU's changes to the new regulations promulgated on 1 January 2015, for B2C electronic service providers. These services are subject to tax management at the consumer's residence or residence (not the supplier's residence), which requires foreign service providers to register and pay VAT in the EU member states to which the consumer belongs. But not only can this change be felt in the EU, but similar rules may also soon be introduced in Albania, Angola, Japan, South Africa, and South Korea.

The United States faces special challenges in this regard. For the United States, most of its own consumption tax is the sale of single-rate products. In order to keep up with the rapid development of the Internet economy, many state and federal governments have successfully enacted legislation requiring "remote sellers" (suppliers who sell taxable goods to customers in other states) to collect and remit taxes across states. The most recent trend is to apply sales and use taxes to trade intangible assets (remote access to electronic delivery software, digital music, and books). Similarly, the processing of designated IT services, including data processing, "cloud computing" and "information services", continues to face the scrutiny of national legislators. Many states have announced that they are considering expanding sales to cover a wider range of service transactions. Most notably, California lawmakers announced at the end of 2014 that they would tax almost all service transactions in the country (except for healthcare and education services) to offset the reduced personal income tax rate. Of course, if you want these measures to succeed, it depends on the situation.

== See also ==
- Direct tax
- Financial repression
- Value-added tax (VAT)
