= Tax incidence =

Measure of the economic effect of a tax

In economics, the tax incidence measures who actually pays for a tax. Economists distinguish between the entities who ultimately bear the burden of a tax (the real incidence) and those who the tax is originally collected from (the nominal incidence). The tax burden measures the true economic effect of the tax, measured by the difference between real incomes before and after imposing the tax, and taking into account how the tax causes prices to change. For example, if a 10% tax is imposed on sellers of butter, but the market price rises 8% as a result, then 80% of the tax incidence falls on buyers, not sellers.

Tax incidence is said to "fall" upon the group that ultimately bears the burden of, or ultimately suffers a loss from, the tax. The key concept of tax incidence is the finding that the tax burden does not depend on where the revenue is collected, but on the price elasticity of demand and price elasticity of supply.

The concept of tax incidence is used in political science and sociology to analyze the level of resources extracted from each income social stratum in order to describe how the tax burden is distributed among social classes. That allows one to derive some inferences about the progressive nature of the tax system, according to principles of vertical equity.

The theory of tax incidence has a number of practical results. For example, United States Social Security payroll taxes are nominally paid half by the employee and half by the employer. However, economists generally find that workers bear most of the burden of the tax, because the employer passes it on in the form of lower wages. The tax incidence is thus said to fall mainly on the employee.

== Tax incidence in competitive markets ==
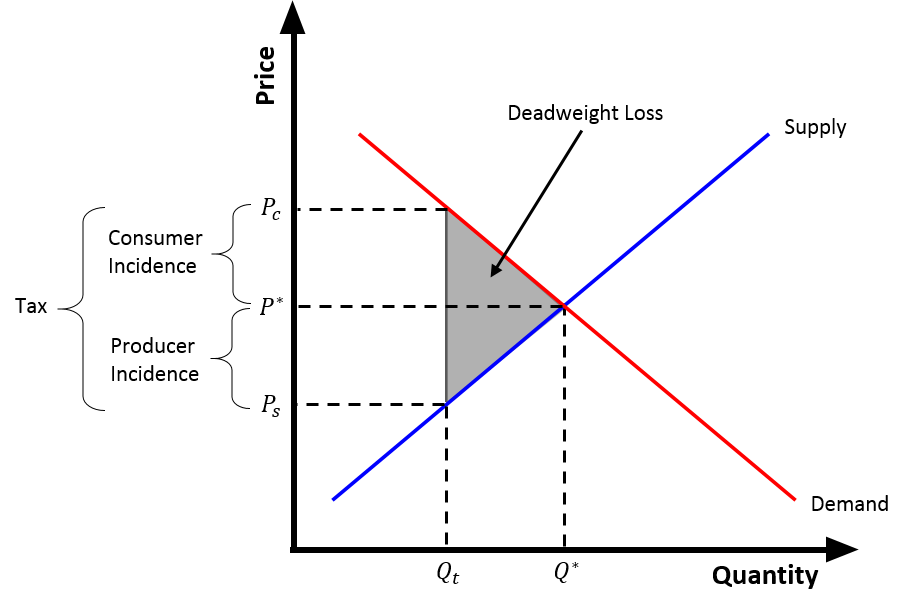
Figure 1 – tax incidence in perfect competition

In competitive markets, firms supply a quantity of the product such that the price of the good equals marginal cost (supply curve and marginal cost curve are indifferent). If an excise tax (a tax on the goods being sold) is imposed on producers of the particular good or service, the supply curve shifts to the left because of the increase of marginal cost. The tax size predicts the new level of quantity supplied, which is reduced in comparison to the initial level. In Figure 1, a demand curve is added into this instance of competitive market. The demand curve and shifted supply curve create a new equilibrium, which is burdened by the tax. The new equilibrium (with higher price and lower quantity than initial equilibrium) represents the price that consumers will pay for a given quantity of good extended by the part of the tax $(p_0+kt), k \in [0,1].$

The point on the initial supply curve with respect to quantity of the good after taxation represents the price (from which the part of the tax is subtracted $(p_0-(1-k)t), k \in [0,1])$ that producers will receive at given quantity. In Figure 1, the tax burden is borne equally by the producers and consumers. For example, if the initial price of the good is $2, and the tax levied on the production is $.40, consumers will be able to buy the good for $2.20, while producers will receive $1.80.

Consider the case when the tax is levied on consumers. Unlike when tax is imposed on producers, the demand curve shifts to the left to create new equilibrium with initial supply (marginal cost) curve. The new equilibrium (at a lower price and lower quantity) represents the price that producers will receive after taxation and the point on the initial demand curve with respect to quantity of the good after taxation represents the price that consumers will pay due to the tax. Thus, it does not matter whether the tax is levied on consumers or producers.

It also does not matter whether the tax is levied as a percentage of the price (say ad valorem tax) or as a fixed sum per unit (say specific tax). Both are graphically expressed as a shift of the demand curve to the left. While the demand curve moved by specific tax is parallel to the initial, the demand curve shifted by ad valorem tax is touching the initial, when the price is zero and deviating from it when the price is growing. However, in the market equilibrium both curves cross.

Income taxes are taxes on the supply of labor (if the income is wages) or capital (if the income is dividends, for example). Corporate income tax incidence is difficult to evaluate because although the direct burden is on corporate shareholders, the tax tends to move capital to be supplied more to non-corporate uses such as housing or partnerships, reducing the return to capital generally, and it moves capital abroad, reducing wages. Thus, in the long-run, once the quantity of capital has adjusted, the incidence is likely on non-corporate capital as much as corporate capital, and much of it may be on labor. Economists' estimates of the incidence vary widely.

== Example of tax incidence ==
Imagine a $1 tax on every barrel of apples a farmer produces. If the farmer is able to pass the entire tax on to consumers by raising the price by $1, the product (apples) is price inelastic to the consumer. In this example, consumers bear the entire burden of the tax—the tax incidence falls on consumers. On the other hand, if the apple farmer is unable to raise prices because the product is price elastic, the farmer has to bear the burden of the tax or face decreased revenues—the tax incidence falls on the farmer. If the apple farmer can raise prices by an amount less than $1, then consumers and the farmer are sharing the tax burden. When the tax incidence falls on the farmer, this burden will typically flow back to owners of the relevant factors of production, including agricultural land and employee wages.

Where the tax incidence falls depends (in the short run) on the price elasticity of demand and price elasticity of supply. Tax incidence falls mostly upon the group that responds least to price (the group that has the most inelastic price-quantity curve). If the demand curve is inelastic relative to the supply curve the tax will be disproportionately borne by the buyer rather than the seller. If the demand curve is elastic relative to the supply curve, the tax will be borne disproportionately by the seller. If -PED = PES, the tax burden is split equally between buyer and seller.

Tax incidence can be calculated using the pass-through fraction. The pass-through fraction for buyers is:

$$\dfrac{PES}{PES - PED}$$

So if PED for apples is −0.4 and PES is 0.5, then the pass-through fraction to buyer would be calculated as follows:

$$\begin{align}
\dfrac{PES}{PES - PED} &= \dfrac{0.5}{0.5 - (-.0.4)} \\
\\
&= \dfrac{0.5}{0.9} \\
\\
&= 56\%
\end{align}$$

So 56% of any tax increase would be "paid" by the buyer; 44% would be "paid" by the seller. From the perspective of the seller, the formula is:

$$\begin{align}
\dfrac{-PED}{PES - PED} &= -\dfrac{-0.4}{0.5 - (-.0.4)} \\
\\
&= \dfrac{0.4}{0.9} \\
\\
&= 44\%
\end{align}$$

== Elasticity and tax incidence ==
Compared to previous phenomena, elasticity of the demand and supply curve is an essential feature that predicts how much the consumers and producers will be burdened in the specific case of taxation. As a general rule, the steeper the demand curve and the flatter the supply curve, the more the consumers will bear the tax. The flatter the demand curve and the steeper the supply curve, the more the producers will bear the tax.

=== Inelastic supply, elastic demand ===
Because the producer is inelastic, they will produce the same quantity no matter the price. Because the consumer is elastic, the consumer is very sensitive to price. A small increase in price leads to a large drop in the quantity demanded. The imposition of the tax causes the market price to increase from P without tax to P with tax and the quantity demanded to fall from Q without tax to Q with tax. Because the consumer is elastic, the quantity change is significant. Because the producer is inelastic, the price doesn't change much. The producer is unable to pass the tax onto the consumer and the tax incidence falls on the producer. In this example, the tax is collected from the producer and the producer bears the tax burden. This is known as back shifting.

=== Elastic supply, inelastic demand ===
If, in contrast to the previous example, the consumer is inelastic, they will demand the same quantity no matter the price. Because the producer is elastic, the producer is very sensitive to price. A small drop in price leads to a large drop in the quantity produced. The imposition of the tax causes the market price to increase from P without tax to P with tax and the quantity demanded to fall from Q without tax to Q with tax. Because the consumer is inelastic, the quantity doesn't change much. Because the consumer is inelastic and the producer is elastic, the price changes dramatically. The change in price is very large. The producer is able to pass (in the short run) almost the entire value of the tax onto the consumer. Even though the tax is being collected from the producer the consumer is bearing the tax burden. The tax incidence is falling on the consumer, known as forward shifting.

=== Similarly elastic supply and demand ===
Most markets fall between these two extremes, and ultimately the incidence of tax is shared between producers and consumers in varying proportions. In this example, the consumers pay more than the producers, but not all of the tax. The area paid by consumers is obvious as the change in equilibrium price (between P without tax and P with tax); the remainder, being the difference between the new price and the cost of production at that quantity, is paid by the producers.

=== Special cases ===
When the supply curve is perfectly elastic (horizontal) or the demand curve is perfectly inelastic (vertical), the whole tax burden will be levied on consumers. An example of the perfect elastic supply curve is the market of the capital for small countries or businesses. In the instance of perfect elasticity of the demand or perfect inelasticity of the supply, the price will remain the same and the entire tax burden is on producers. An example of perfect inelastic supply curve is unimproved land (the supply of improved land is elastic because more or less could be created by investment in improvements) or crude oil. Thus, the whole tax burden is on landowners and owners of the oil. The other factors that might affect tax incidence are the difference between the short-run and long-run and between open and closed economies.

Effects of relative elasticity on tax incidence

Inelastic supply, elastic demand: the burden is on producers

Similar elasticities: burden shared

Elastic supply, inelastic demand: the burden is on consumers

== The demand and supply for labor and tax incidence ==
All factors, which was derived on the tax incidence and competitive market might be used also in the case of market for labor. The key role of the paying the tax burden is still elasticity of the curves. Thus it does not matter, whether the tax is imposed on supplier (households) or companies, which demand the labor as a factor of production. The tax leads to the lower wages and lower employment. However some economists assumes, that supply curve for the labor is backward-bending. It means, that the quantity of labor increases if the wages increase and from given level of the wage it started to decrease. The shape of the curve follows an idea, that high wages is an incentive to work less. So, if the tax is levied of this type of the market, it reduces the wages and therefore the quantity of labor rises.

== Tax incidence without perfect competition ==
A market with perfect competition is very rare. More of the market is said to be imperfect competition such as monopoly, oligopoly or monopolistic competition. Producers choose the level of output, at which marginal cost equals marginal revenue. The demand curve predicts the price level. After taxation, the marginal cost curve shifts to the left to reach a new equilibrium characterized by lower quantity and higher price than before (that is given by the downward slope of the demand curve and marginal revenue curve). Elasticity of the curves is still the essential factor that predicts the size of the tax burden levied on consumers and producers. In general, the steeper the marginal cost curve, the smaller the observed change in output after taxation. The difference between perfect competition and imperfect competition can be observed when the marginal cost curve is horizontal (perfect elasticity). Unlike under perfect competition, when the tax burden will be on consumer, in the case of imperfect competition the supplier and consumer will share the burden. The size depends on the elasticity of demand curve. For instance, if the demand curve is linear, the ratio is balanced half and half). Another difference lies in the ad valorem tax and specific tax. For any given revenue, the output from ad valorem tax will exceed the output from specific tax.

== Macroeconomic perspective ==
The supply and demand for a good is deeply intertwined with the markets for the factors of production and for alternate goods and services that might be produced or consumed. Although legislators might be seeking to tax the apple industry, in reality it could turn out to be truck drivers who are hardest hit, if apple companies shift toward shipping by rail in response to their new cost. Or perhaps orange manufacturers will be the group most affected, if consumers decide to forgo oranges to maintain their previous level of apples at the now higher price. Ultimately, the burden of the tax falls on people—the owners, customers, or workers.

=== Budget incidence ===
In a closed economy model, the state uses the taxes it collects to buy goods or pay transfers to households and businesses. Tax revenue is in line with government spending. Consequently, not only tax payments should be taken into account in the analysis, but also at the same time the gains of utility for the private sector associated with government spending. That is called budget incidence. Budget incidence represents the combined burden effects of government revenue and government spending. The government budget constraint always applies when deriving them; all tax revenue covers government purchases of goods or transfer payments. In the theory of taxation, however, the benefits of public goods associated with government spending are not taken into account; at most, cash flows back to the private sector are modeled to illustrate the circular flow of income. The comparative analysis of the tax-induced loss of utility and the utility gains generated by public goods and transfers—i.e. the question of the optimum scale of government activity—is the subject of political economy and public finance. In some cases, the goal of explanation pursued with budget incidence is too ambitious, and one restricts oneself to a so-called specific incidence.

Hence, the true burden of the tax cannot be properly assessed without knowing the use of the tax revenues. If the tax proceeds are employed in a manner that benefits owners more than producers and consumers then the burden of the tax will fall on producers and consumers. If the proceeds of the tax are used in a way that benefits producers and consumers, then owners suffer the tax burden. These are class distinctions concerning the distribution of costs and are not addressed in current tax incidence models. The US military offers major benefit to owners who produce offshore. Yet the tax levy to support this effort falls primarily on American producers and consumers. Corporations simply move out of the tax jurisdiction but still receive the property rights enforcement that is the mainstay of their income.

=== Differential incidence ===
Budget incidence and differential incidence are logically on the same level. The only difference between these two techniques is the question they pose. Specific incidence, on the other hand, forms a preliminary stage for investigating budget incidence, and the results obtained here should be treated with caution. When examining differential incidence, government spending is held constant, and one tax is increased or decreased at the expense of another tax. Differential incidence is particularly useful when examining the impact of tax reforms. The question is, for example, what effect can be expected from a reduction in income tax with a simultaneous revenue-neutral increase in sales tax. Like budget incidence, differential incidence can be studied in a closed model in which the government budget constraint is always satisfied.

=== Specific incidence ===
When examining specific incidence (or absolute incidence), a single tax is increased or decreased, and at the same time, it is assumed that both government spending and other taxes remain unchanged. Strictly speaking, this cannot be the case. Specific incidence can thus be justified in the context of a partial analysis that looks at a single market rather than the economy as a whole. However, it must be examined in each case whether the obtained results can also be applied at the macro level. The advantage of dealing with specific incidence lies in methodology because the partial analytical treatment of a single market is more straightforward than dealing with macroeconomic models, and in many cases, the findings obtained are consistent with those that would result from a macroeconomic analysis.

=== Other considerations of tax burden ===
Consider a 7% import tax applied equally to all imports (oil, autos, hula hoops, and brake rotors; steel, grain, everything) and a direct refund of every penny of collected revenue in the form of a direct egalitarian citizen's dividend to every person who files income tax returns. The import tax (tariff) will increase prices of goods for all domestic consumers, compared to the world price. This increase in the price of goods will result in two types of Deadweight loss: one attributable to domestic producers being incentivized to produce goods that would be more efficiently produced internationally, and the other attributable to domestic consumers being forced out of the market for goods that they would have bought, had the price not been artificially inflated by the tariff (import tax). The actual cost of the tax will be borne by whichever party (producers or consumers) has the more inelastic demand (see earlier section on relative elasticities), regardless of whether consumers buy domestic or foreign goods, and regardless of where the producers make their goods.

=== Tax burden of a country relative to GDP ===
A country or state's tax burden as a percentage of GDP is the ratio of tax collection against the national gross domestic product (GDP). This is one way of illustrating how high and broad the tax base is in any particular place. Some countries, like Denmark, have a high tax-to-GDP ratio (as high as 48%, the highest in the world). Other countries, like India, have a low ratio. Some states increase the tax-to-GDP ratio by a certain percentage in order to cover deficiencies in the state budget revenue. In states where the tax revenue has gone up significantly, the percentage of tax revenue that is applied towards state revenue and foreign debt is sometimes higher. When tax revenues grow at a slower rate than the GDP of a country, the tax-to-GDP ratio drops. Taxes paid by individuals and corporations often account for the majority of tax receipts, especially in developed countries.

=== Consumer and producer surplus ===
The burden from taxation is not just the quantity of tax paid (directly or indirectly), but the magnitude of the lost consumer surplus or producer surplus. The concepts are related but different. For example, imposing a $1,000-per-gallon milk tax will raise no revenue (because legal milk production will stop), but this tax will cause substantial economic harm (lost consumer surplus and lost producer surplus). When examining tax incidence, it is the lost consumer and producer surplus that is important. See the tax article for more discussion.

== Effects on the budget constraint ==
Through the budget constraint might be seen, that uniform tax on wages and uniform tax on consumption have an equivalent impact. Both taxes shift the budget constraint to the left. New line will be characterized by same slope as the initial (parallelism).

== Other practical results ==
The theory of tax incidence has a large number of practical results, although economists dispute the magnitude and significance of these results:

- If the government requires employers to provide employees with health care, some of the burden will fall on the employee as the employer will pass it on in the form of lower wages. Some of the burden will be borne by employer (and ultimately the customer in form of higher prices or lower quality) since both the supply of and demand for labor are highly inelastic and have few perfect substitutes. Employers need employees largely to the extent they can substitute employees for machines, and employees need employers largely to the extent they can become self-employed entrepreneurs. An uneducated population is therefore more susceptible to bearing the burden because they are more easily replaced by machines able to do unskilled work, and because they have less knowledge of how to make money on their own.
- Taxes on easily substitutable goods, such as oranges and tangerines, may be borne mostly by the producer because the demand curve for easily substitutable goods is quite elastic.
- Similarly, taxes on a business that can easily be relocated are likely to be borne almost entirely by the residents of the taxing jurisdiction and not the owners of the business.
- The burden of tariffs (import taxes) on imported vehicles might fall largely on the producers of the cars because the demand curve for foreign cars might be elastic if car consumers may substitute a domestic car purchase for a foreign car purchase.
- If consumers drive the same number of miles regardless of gas prices, then a tax on gasoline will be paid for by consumers and not oil companies (this is assuming that the price elasticity of supply of oil is high). Who actually bears the economic burden of the tax is not affected by whether government collects the tax at the pump or directly from oil companies.

== Tax burden analysis ==
Chart comparing effective total (federal and state and local) tax rates in the United States, of the richest Americans and those in the bottom 50% of earners

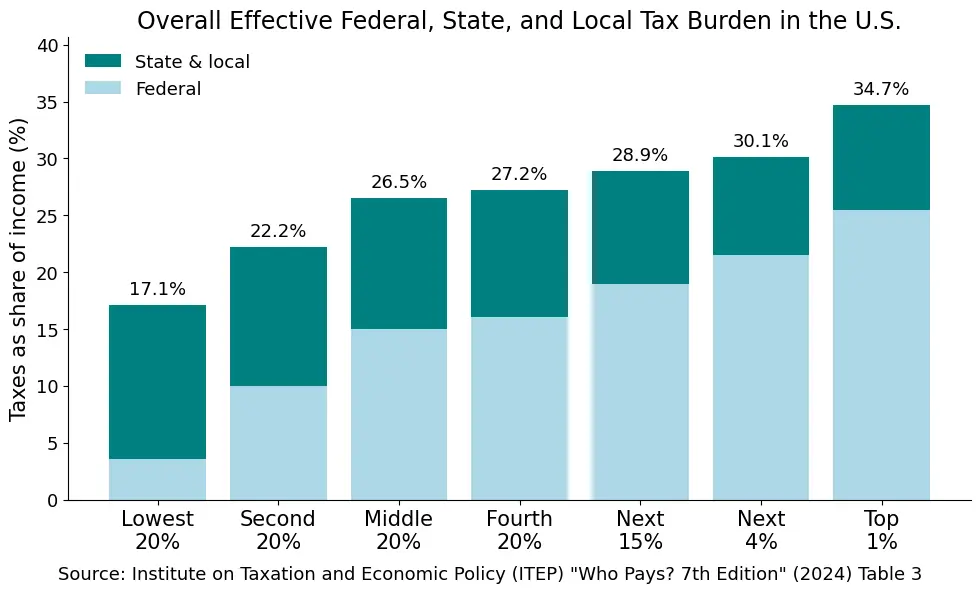
Overall tax burden in the US in 2024

Predominantly, studies of different distributions of the tax burden are carried out at a comparative level, either geographically (between different countries) or intertemporally (comparing distributions under different governments or regimes). The tax burden analysis aims to describe how different social classes contribute to the public sector.

In the United States, the analysis regarding how the tax burden affects each of its social classes is conducted regularly. The Congressional Budget Office (CBO) presents a series of reports showing the share of all federal taxes paid by taxpayers at the same point in the income distribution. Their data for 2017 shows the following:

- The top 1% of the distribution pay 25% of all federal taxes.
- The highest quintile pays 87% of all individual income taxes and 69% of all federal taxes.

CBO distribution tables typically report taxes remitted (for example, individual income and payroll taxes paid directly by households). A consumer-facing perspective additionally attributes taxes that are commonly embedded in consumer prices, such as excise taxes and customs duties (tariffs), and recognizes that some business taxes may be partly shifted forward into prices.

- Federal excise taxes are generally collected from producers or wholesalers but are commonly embedded in the prices paid by final consumers. Because low- and middle-income households spend a larger share of income on consumption, federal excise taxes tend to be regressive relative to annual income in distributional analyses, though burdens vary by the taxed items consumed.
- Customs duties (tariffs) are also a form of consumption tax when they raise the prices of imported goods and close substitutes; the consumer burden depends on tariff pass-through and substitution patterns, and can differ whom legally remits the duty.
- The corporate income tax may also affect consumers if firms pass some of the tax forward into prices. Empirical studies find evidence of consumer price pass-through in some settings, though estimates vary and depend on market structure and time horizon. Some official distributional scorekeeping instead assigns corporate-tax burdens primarily to owners of capital (and sometimes partly to labor), reflecting alternative incidence assumptions rather than direct observation of price effects.

Such consumer channels can be summarized as effective tax rates that include direct household taxes (income and payroll) and consumer-facing taxes embedded in prices (excise taxes, customs duties, and any modeled consumer share of business taxes).

== Assessment ==
Assessing tax incidence is a major economics subfield within the field of public finance.

Most public finance economists acknowledge that nominal tax incidence (i.e. who writes the check to pay a tax) is not necessarily identical to actual economic burden of the tax, but disagree greatly among themselves on the extent to which market forces disturb the nominal tax incidence of various types of taxes in various circumstances.

The effects of certain kinds of taxes, for example, the property tax, including their economic incidence, efficiency properties and distributional implications, have been the subject of a long and contentious debate among economists.

The empirical evidence tends to support different economic models under different circumstances. For example, empirical evidence on property tax incidents tends to support one economic model, known as the "benefit tax" view in suburban areas, while tending to support another economic model, known as the "capital tax" view in urban and rural areas.

There is an inherent conflict in any model between considering many factors, which complicates the model and makes it hard to apply, and using a simple model, which may limit the circumstances in which its predictions are empirically useful.

== See also ==
- Effect of taxes and subsidies on price
- Excess burden of taxation
- Externalities and Pigovian taxes
- Fiscal incidence, both tax incidence and the economic impact of government expenditures
- Flypaper theory of tax incidence
- Optimal tax
- List of countries by tax revenue as percentage of GDP
