= Tax policy =

Choice by a government as to what taxes to levy, in what amounts, and on whom

Tax policy refers to the guidelines and principles established by a government for the imposition and collection of taxes. It encompasses both microeconomic and macroeconomic aspects. The former focuses on issues of fairness and efficiency in tax collection, and the latter focuses on the overall quantity of taxes to be collected and its impact on economic activity. The tax framework of a country is considered a crucial instrument for influencing the country's economy.

Tax policies have significant implications for specific groups within an economy, such as households, firms, and banks. These policies are often intended to promote economic growth; however, there is significant debate among economists about the most effective ways to achieve this.

Taxation is both a political and economic issue. Political leaders often use tax policies to advance their agendas through various tax reforms, such as changes to tax rates, definitions of taxable income, and the creation of new taxes. Specific groups, such as small business owners, farmers, and retired individuals, can often exert political pressure to reduce their share of the tax burden. The tax code is often complex and includes rules that benefit certain groups of taxpayers while shifting more of the burden to others.

== Main reasons for taxation ==
There are some main reasons why government needs to collect taxes:

1. Market failure - mainly to discourage purchases of that product (any tax creates a disincentive, so consumers will reduce their purchases and seek alternatives).
  - Taxes can create incentives promoting desirable behavior and disincentives for unwanted behavior. Taxes can change consumers' behavior and thus influence the market outcome. For example, in the presence of externalities, an —omnipotent and ethical policymaker would want to change the market outcome to reach the social optimum (otherwise there would be a deadweight loss of externality). In such a case, policymakers would implement excise taxes, carbon tax etc.
2. To generate revenue.
  - Taxation is the most important source of government revenue. Governments can use tax revenue to provide public services such as social security, health care, national defense, and education.
3. Changing the distribution of income and wealth.
  - Taxation provides a means to redistribute economic resources toward those with low income or special needs (tax revenue can be used for transfer payments such as welfare benefits).

== Philosophy ==
Policymakers debate the nature of the tax structure they plan to implement (i.e., how progressive or regressive) and how these taxes might affect individuals and businesses (i.e., tax incidence).

The reason for this focus is economic efficiency; as advisor to the Stuart King of England Richard Petty had noted "The government does not want to kill the goose that lays the golden egg". Paradigmatic efficient taxes are those that are either non-distortionary or lump sum. However, economists define distortion only according to the substitution effect, because anything that does not change relative prices is non-distortionary. One must also consider the income effect, which for tax policy purposes often needs to be assumed to cancel out in the aggregate. The efficiency loss is depicted on the demand curve and supply curve diagrams as the area inside Harberger's Triangle.

National Insurance in the United Kingdom and Social Security in the United States are forms of social welfare funded outside their national income tax systems, paid for through worker contributions, something labeled a stealth tax by critics.

== Administration ==
The implementation of tax policy has always been a complex business. For example, in pre-revolutionary colonial America, the argument "No taxation without representation" resulted from the tax policy of the British Crown, which taxed the settlers but offered no say in their government. A more recent American example is President George H. W. Bush's famous tax policy quote, "Read my lips: no new taxes."

Efficient tax administration is key to encouraging businesses to become formally registered, thereby expanding the tax base and revenues. On the other hand, an unfair tax administration can harm the tax system and reduce the government's legitimacy. In many developing countries, the failure to improve tax administration while introducing new tax systems has led to widespread tax evasion and lower tax revenues. It is important to keep tax rules clear and simple to encourage compliance, as high tax evasion is associated with complicated tax systems. As the tax administration ecosystem evolves with the introduction of new analytical tools, digital information flows are increasing. Consequently, the tax administration is operating in a way that increases incentives for compliant taxpayers.

== Operating costs of tax policy ==
Modern taxation systems can impose a heavy burden on taxpayers particularly on small businesse taxpayers. That burden typically consists of three elements. Firstly, there are the taxes themselves. Secondly, there are the efficiency costs (variously referred to as deadweight losses or excess burden), the third type of costs are compliance costs of taxation, and finally, there are the administrative costs (sometimes referred to as operating costs) of the tax system. Administrative costs can be described as costs incurred by (mainly) public sector agents to administer the tax-benefit system. The relationship between administrative and compliance costs of taxation is not always clear at first glance. Sometimes, there might be an inverse relationship between them, which is a phenomenon called "The administrative-costs compliance-costs trade-off." An example of this inverse relationship might be the implementation of a self-assessment system in taxation. However, This trade-off principle is not always the reality, as it is, for example, possible to reduce both types of costs through some sort of simplification of the tax system or an increase in compliance costs might occur as a result of administrative inefficiency. These types of costs together are called operating costs of taxation.

When implementing some new parts of tax policy or reorganizing it, policymakers always have to consider the weight of administrative costs and compliance costs of taxation. There are two main types of administrative costs:

1. Direct administrative costs
2. Indirect administrative costs

=== Direct administrative costs ===
Direct administrative costs are on the government side (the burden is borne by the government). "It is not immediately obvious, exactly, which activities should be attributed to the operation of the … system" (p. 19). Administrative costs are mainly connected to running the tax collection office - they include salaries of staff, costs of legislative enactment relating to the tax system, judicial costs of administration of the tax dispute system, and many more.

=== Indirect administrative costs ===
Indirect administrative costs are on the side of taxpayers (the burden is borne by the government). Tax compliance costs are those costs "incurred by taxpayers, or third parties such as businesses, in meeting the requirements laid upon them in complying with a given structure and level of tax" (Sandford, Godwin and Hardwick, 1989, p. 10). Indirect administrative costs are mainly connected to the costs of complying with tax requirements - it includes the costs of labour/time consumed in completion of tax activities, filling out forms, record keeping, the fees paid to professional tax advisers, transfer pricing and many more.

=== Compliance costs ===
Tax compliance costs are the costs "incurred by taxpayers, or third parties such as businesses, in meeting the requirements laid upon them in complying with a given structure and level of tax". There is no consensus about what should and should not be included under the definition of compliance costs, although one distinction usually made is between gross versus net compliance costs. The difference between the two is made up of any financial or managerial benefit derived by the taxpayer from tax compliance. However, there is a possibility to define some indisputable examples of costs, that are directly connected to the compliance of individual taxpayers. These examples include the costs of labor and time required for the completion of tax activities, such as acquiring the necessary knowledge to operate within the tax system properly or compiling and creating all documents needed. More examples include the cost of purchasing professional assistance for the completion of tax activities, or other expenses connected to tax activities, such as purchasing software and hardware.

Other types of compliance costs, such as the negative psychological effects on taxpayers as a result of the attempts to comply with the current tax policy or many types of social costs, are very intangible, and it is, therefore, hard to quantify them, even though the effect of their existence is visible, especially for individuals and small businesses.

== Equity-efficiency trade-off ==
An equity-efficiency trade-off appears when there is some kind of conflict between maximizing equity and maximizing economic efficiency. The trade-off between equity and efficiency is at the heart of many discussions of tax policy. Two questions are debated. First, there is disagreement about the nature of the trade-off. To reduce inequality, how much efficiency do we have to give up? Second, there is a disagreement about the relative value to be attributed to the reduction in inequality compared to the reduction in efficiency.

Some people claim that inequality is the central problem of society, and society should simply minimize the extent of inequality, regardless of the consequences to efficiency. Others claim that efficiency is the central issue. These disagreements relate to social choices between equity and efficiency.

=== Equity ===
Equity can be divided into two main groups: horizontal equity and vertical equity.

1. Vertical equity
  - Vertical equity is a method of taxation based on the principle that the higher the income of an individual is the higher the personal income tax liability (i.e. as your income goes up, you pay more). Vertical equity is often more achievable than horizontal equity because horizontal equity is harder to implement - it is not easy to define and it can be undermined by loopholes and deductions. Since this method takes into consideration the ability to pay taxpayers, nowadays it is one of the most accepted taxation methods by various countries around the world.
  - The ability to pay principle, says that the amount of a tax a person pays has to be dependent on the burden the tax will create about the wealth of an individual. Vertical equity operates on the principle of people with higher incomes paying more taxes, through progressive tax rates. In progressive taxation, the amount of taxes paid increases with income. In this tax system people are divided into tax brackets, each tax bracket has a different tax rate, with high-income brackets paying more taxes. With this taxation system, the effective tax rates increase with income. Furthermore, another possibility is the proportional tax method in which the income is charged at a single rate regardless of income. This taxation method is also known as flat taxes.
2. Horizontal equity
  - The basic principle of horizontal equity is based on the concept of distributive justice, in which taxpayers should pay the same level of income tax in proportion to their respective income groups. Most important, but more costly is to define income groups, knowing that each individual consumes and saves in different ways, making it very hard for tax policymakers. Horizontal equity requires a tax system that does not give preference to certain individuals or companies. It makes sure that we don't have discrimination on the grounds. Horizontal equity is a constant topic of tax policy discussions and in many countries, it is a cause of several exemptions, deductions and special provisions.

=== Efficiency ===
Economic efficiency is equivalent to the concept of Pareto efficiency. Pareto efficiency refers to a situation in which resources are allocated so that it is impossible to make one individual better off without making another worse off. Achieving efficiency often involves establishing a decentralised market mechanism, although the tax system is sometimes viewed as an obstacle to this process. This raises the question of how to balance efficiency and equity. A Pareto improvement occurs when at least one individual is made better off without making anyone else worse off. This concept provides a basis for evaluating which policies should be implemented.

==== Social choice ====
The choices or decisions of the government are one of the social choices. Social choice consists of two elements: Individual level and societal level. For the individual level, each individual builds their preference and has their utility following the budgets' constraint. This can form an indifference curve. And we can say that the points which are on this curve are matched to pareto efficiency. In the society's level, the curve is created by seeing the participants as Group A and Group B. Here, the curve is an inversely proportional relationship which is a very common style in the Pareto efficiency curve.At this curve, when Group A's utility will get down, Group B's utility will get increased. (There are other curves in other ways: Utilitarian way and Rawlsian way). When attempting to implement economic policies and projects, the measurement of the net benefits of different groups is needed and to consider that the project/policy is the Pareto improvement. Under social choice, if the project/policy has net positive gains and reduces measured inequality, it should be taken. If net positivity can not be determined, other factors are utilised: The compensation principle, the inverse proportion of measures of efficiency and equality, and the weighted benefits approach. The inverse proportional of measures of efficiency and equality is the judgement based on the contemplation of efficiency and equality. The weighted benefits approach is focused on the total amount of utility. The compensation principle is based on the willingness to pay the tax. If people are motivated to pay, there is a growth in consumer surplus. In this principle, when the willingness to pay is more than the cost to do so (Including if there is a cost imbalance for individuals) the projects/policies should be taken. The compensation principle can overcome the difficulty of taxation due to the intervening efficiency.

== Tax policy in the European union ==
=== Main principles and objectives ===
==== No unified tax policy ====
The EU Commission stated the belief that "there is no need for an across-the-board-harmonization of Member States' tax systems.". Member states are to take full control of which tax system they want to impose, as long as they respect the rules of the EU. There is a possibility for tax field action of the EU under the principles of subsidiarity and proportionality, and also under the assumption that the member state in question was not able to provide an effective solution, therefore there is a need for support in terms of coordination for example.

==== Removing obstacles ====
As a part of the EU's objective to empower its citizens to play a full part in the market, the organization announced in 2020 that the objective is to ensure that tax rules do not discourage individuals from benefiting from the internal market. The Communication "Removing cross-border tax obstacles for EU citizens" outlines the most serious tax problems that EU citizens face in cross-border situations, such as discrimination, and double taxation.

== Tax policy of developing countries ==
The tax policies of different countries differ in many ways. Besides that, there are some patterns that we can observe among various groups of countries with the same characteristics. An example of this would be the low level and utility of taxes in developing countries. "Low-income countries typically collect taxes of between 10 to 20 percent of GDP, while the average for high-income countries is more like 40 percent."

=== Problems faced by tax policymakers in developing countries ===
There are several challenges that tax policymakers in developing countries have to face and that make it difficult for each of these developing countries to introduce effective and equitable tax systems, tackle inequality and corruption or increase their development level. As a result of this, developing countries often use tax policies that are not very effective in terms of generating tax revenue, therefore not allocating the country the funds needed for improvement.

==== Unclear incomes ====
As many people in developing countries are often paid wages based on the time they spend at work (volatile value), and many are paid in cash which lowers the government's ability to track such money flows, it is difficult to keep record of any reliable data on income and wealth distribution in the country. This leads to a situation in which the policymakers are unable to create statistics or models that would allow them to propose changes to the current tax system (mainly income taxes in this case) in the country, that would improve the situation (mainly the efficiency vs. equity trade-off).

==== Unclear spendings ====
Similarly to the problem regarding unclear incomes, a big part of the spending in developing countries is done in such a way that does not lead to extensive spending reports being supplied to the government. This lack of information is supported by the fact that just like in the case of incomes, most spending is done in cash which is, again, more difficult to keep a record of. In this situation, policymakers are deprived of the ability to analyze spending statistics in their country and thus they are not able to produce changes to the tax system (mainly the sales taxes) in their country.

==== Limitations on taxing imports ====
"About taxes on imports, lowering these taxes will lead to more competition from foreign enterprises. While reducing protection of domestic industries from this foreign competition is an inevitable consequence, or even the objective, of a trade liberalization program, reduced budgetary revenue would be an unwelcome by-product of the program."

=== Limitations of used taxes ===
Despite the problems in keeping track of many economic activities in developing countries, naturally, various taxes are in effect in these countries. These generate revenue but there are certain limitations to these taxes which make them not as effective as they could be.

==== Personal income tax ====
The personal income tax in developing countries commonly has some rate of progressivity, meaning grouping individuals into various groups based on their income and then imposing different rates of the personal income tax on each group. The limitations which often make this kind of tax ineffective in developing countries are several various exemptions in the parts of an individual's income that are taxable as well as setting off the borders between different tax brackets. These make it often more favourable for an individual to establish a business and therefore pay (lower) corporate income tax rather than personal income tax. But even without this, reaching the highest tax bracket (with the highest marginal tax rate) as an individual often requires incomes so high that only a small number of people in the country reach it.

==== Corporate income tax ====
Similarly to the case of the personal income tax, there are various rates of the corporate income tax based mainly on the sector that the company generates revenue. This allows the corporations to take actions which allow them to pay lower taxes and effectively practice tax avoidance.

==== Value added tax ====
As much as the VAT is an effective tool to generate revenue for the government, there are some setbacks to the implementation of the VAT in developing countries. One is that there are certain goods and services which are not included in the VAT list and therefore "reduce the benefits from introducing the VAT in the first place." Another one is introducing various VAT rates for different goods and services. This usually leads to a higher popularity of the tax policy and can even increase the revenue of the tax but the administrative cost of such a measure can outweigh said benefits, especially in the case of developing countries.

=== Possible improvements for developing countries ===
The path to improved tax systems in developing countries is a long and demanding one, but it can be done. Several aspects of the current tax systems should be changed to make the situation and the tax revenue of the county better. These include changes in the attitude towards foreign investment in the country. This money flow and its taxation is one of the main sources of revenue for many developing countries. This should be changed, but at the same time, the measures used should not make it less beneficial for foreign investors to bring their money to the country.

Another problem that needs to be tackled is the personal income tax. This is a tax with a large potential but it is one which currently only brings a small portion of money to the government's budget in many developing countries. Capital-gains and capital-transfers tax implementations are other ways of improving the state of the tax systems in developing countries.

There is a document made by the OECD designed to assist developing countries in transforming and improving their tax systems. In this document, the OECD not only offers suggestions for improvement but also guarantees assistance with certain measures.

==== OECD assistance in health taxes ====
"The OECD can support countries in improving the design of their health taxes - including on tobacco, alcohol and sugar-sweetened beverages - to improve the health of the population and raise revenues. The OECD can also help with implementing any necessary accompanying changes to the tax system that will increase the role of health taxes in financing healthcare systems."

== See also ==
- Sin tax
- Tax incidence
- Tax law

== Bibliography ==
- Mirrlees, James; Adam, Stuart; Besley, Tim; et al. (2011). Tax by design. Oxford University Press. ISBN 978-0-19-955374-7.
