= Flypaper (disambiguation) =

Flypaper is a fly-killing device.

Flypaper may also refer to:

- Flypaper (1998 film), an American comedy film starring Craig Sheffer and Robert Loggia
- Flypaper (2011 film), an American crime comedy film starring Patrick Dempsey and Ashley Judd
- "The Flypaper", an episode of Tales of the Unexpected based on a short story by Elizabeth Taylor

== See also ==
- Flypaper effect, an economic assertion that "money sticks where it hits"
- Flypaper theory (disambiguation)
