= Frank Chaloupka =

American economist

Frank J. Chaloupka (born c. 1962) is an American professor of economics at the University of Illinois at Chicago (UIC) and an affiliate of the National Bureau of Economic Research. He is an expert in the economic analysis of substance use disorders and on the effect of prices and substance control policies in affecting the demands for tobacco, alcohol and illicit drugs.

== Early life ==
Frank Chaloupka received his BA in economics from John Carroll University in Ohio in May 1984, and his PhD from the Graduate Center of the City University of New York in May 1988, specializing in health economics, industrial organization, labor economics, and applied econometrics.

== Career ==
As of 2022, Chaloupka worked as a researcher on a Cancer Prevention And Control program at University of Illinois at Chicago.

In 2009, Chaloupka was named UIC Researcher of the Year. He is the "first winner of the UIC Researcher of the Year award for social science and humanities."

== Personal life ==
Chaloupka directs Impacteen, a collaboration funded by the Robert Wood Johnson Foundation which investigates common threats to adolescent health, such as obesity, substance use disorders and tobacco use, based at the UIC Institute for Health Research and Policy, and collaborators are at RAND, Roswell Park Comprehensive Cancer Center, and other institutions around the country.

Chaloupka has a wife named Eshell, and three children; Benjamin, Jacob, and Frank.

== See also ==
- Drug policy
- Tobacco control
- Tobacco taxation
