= Tobacco Duty =

Tax on tobacco products in the UK

Tobacco Duty or Tobacco Products Duty, is a tax levied on tobacco products, including cigarettes, cigars and hand rolling tobacco, manufactured in or imported into the United Kingdom. The rate of taxation is set annually in the budget, by the Chancellor of the Exchequer.

== History ==
King James imposed and increased tax on the importation of tobacco. James disliked smoking and described it as being "custome lothesome to the eye, hateful to the nose, harmful to the brain, dangerous to the lungs, and in the black and stinking fume thereof, nearest resembling the horrible stygian smoke of the pit that is bottomless".

By the mid-17th century, smoking was commonplace. Taxes from the importation of tobacco, from places such as America, were so important to the government that in 1660 the government introduced the Tobacco Planting and Sowing Act to prohibit the cultivation of tobacco in the UK. The legislation that deals with tobacco duty is the Tobacco Products Duty Act 1979.

For financial year 2025 to 2026, the Office for Budget Responsibility estimated that tobacco duties would raise £8 billion for the government. Tobacco tax is subject to debate as research has shown that it disproportionately impacts people in lower socioeconomic groups. 80% of the cost of cigarettes was made up of taxes in 2025. Supporters of tobacco tax state that taxation is important to reduce smoking prevalence.

== See also ==
- Tobacco control
- Tobacco taxation
