= Securities turnover excise tax =

A securities turnover excise tax (STET) is a small tax on every stock, swap, derivative, or other trade. It has been levied historically in the United States and has been proposed more recently as a way to reduce speculation in financial markets.

== History ==
In the United States, the STET was used to fund the Spanish–American War.

Re-instatement of the STET was briefly proposed in 1990 as a part of US deficit reduction measures.

== Advocacy ==
John Maynard Keynes, in The General Theory of Employment, Interest, and Money suggested that an excise tax on transactions and trades would discourage speculation in the stock market.

In 1934, muckraking journalist and novelist Upton Sinclair ran for Governor of California on the End Poverty in California plan. The fourth plank of the plan called for the repeal of the state's sales tax and imposition of "a tax on stock transfers at the rate of 4 cents per share."

The STET was a major plank of the 2008 platform of American presidential candidate Ralph Nader, and that same year was proposed by Oregon Congressman Peter DeFazio as a means to pay for the Emergency Economic Stabilization Act of 2008.

== See also ==
- Financial transaction tax
- Robin Hood tax
- Stamp duty
- Tobin tax
