= Flypaper theory (economics) =

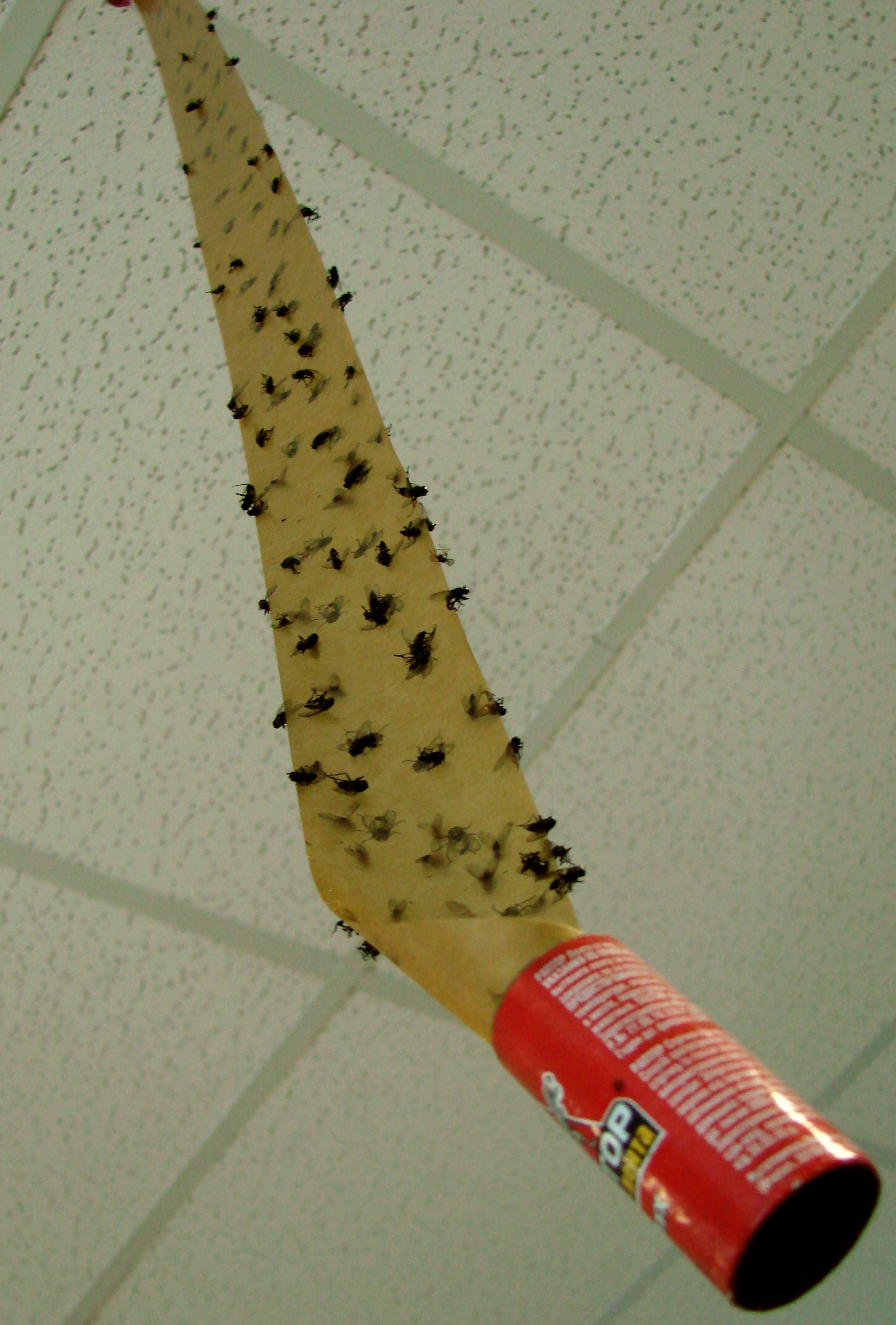
The flypaper theory is named after flypaper.

The flypaper theory of tax incidence is a pejorative term used by economists to describe the assumption that the burden of a tax, like a fly on flypaper, sticks wherever it first lands.

Economists point out several flaws with the assumption:

- it ignores the elasticity of goods; and
- it ignores the ability of producers to shift the cost of the tax onto consumers.

For example, consider a tax levied on a luxury item such as jewelry. Such a tax, while intended to target the wealthy, may not actually accomplish this objective, as the wealthy can simply choose to buy less jewelry. Instead of collecting more money from the wealthy, the tax has the effect of hurting jewelry merchants, who are not the intended targets of the tax.

As another example, suppose a tax is levied on the sellers of a product. The sellers may simply raise the price of the product, thus shifting the burden of the tax onto the buyers of the product.

This should not be confused with the flypaper effect, which holds that money from a federal authority to a state authority tends to increase overall expenditure rather than merely substitute for locally-raised revenue.

== See also ==
- Effect of taxes and subsidies on price
