= Flypaper theory =

Flypaper theory may refer to:

- Flypaper theory (economics), a theory regarding tax burdens
- Flypaper theory (strategy), a military theory regarding drawing enemies to a single area
