= Per unit tax =

Form of sales tax

A per unit tax, or specific tax, is an indirect tax that is defined as a fixed amount for each unit of a good or service sold, such as cents per kilogram. It is thus proportional to the particular quantity of a product sold, regardless of its price. Excise taxes, for instance, fall into this tax category. By contrast, an ad valorem tax is a charge based on a fixed percentage of the product value. Per unit taxes have administrative advantages when it is easy to measure quantities of the product or service being sold.

== Effect on supply curve ==
Any tax will raise cost of production hence shift the supply curve to the left. In the case of specific tax, the shift will be purely parallel because the amount of tax is the same at all prices. That amount is illustrated in the distance between the supply curve with taxation and the one without taxation. Specific tax are indirect tax. This will raise the supply curve vertically by the amount of the tax, and new curve will be parallel to the original curve.

== Tobacco taxation ==
The term specific tax is mostly connected to tobacco taxation. Using specific taxes has proved to be one of the most effective ways to reduce consumption, whereas ad valorem tax which is based on a per cent of product value may lead to substitution to cheaper brands.

== See also ==
- Excise
- Tax policy
