= Bingo Duty =

Tax on Bingo profits in the United Kingdom

Bingo Duty is a tax levied on profits made from organising and promoting bingo games played in the United Kingdom, with certain exceptions.

== Receipts ==
From 27 October 2003 to 22 April 2009, Bingo Duty was set at 15% of gross profits. On 22 April, this was raised to 22% until 29 March 2010, when it was reduced to 20%. From 1 July 2014, Bingo Duty has been set at 10%.

Bingo Duty receipts
Tax year	Sum (£)	Ref.
2010–11	99,607,000	
2011–12	85,223,000	
2012–13	75,369,000	
2013–14	75,593,000	
2014–15	46,994,000	
2015–16	33,891,000	
2016–17	34,504,000	
2017–18	32,381,000	
2018–19	33,426,000	
2019–20	30,776,000	

== Exceptions ==
Bingo Duty is paid on the profits from organising and promoting bingo games played in the UK, except:

- bingo played at home
- bingo on a machine that is covered by Machine Games Duty
- non-profit making bingo, where the organiser does not charge a player a fee to take part
- bingo at certain amusement arcades and travelling fairs, if the stakes and prizes are below specific limits

Small-scale bingo is also exempt from Bingo Duty if promoted by a club, organisation or other association of people that does not have a bingo operating licence, provided that either of the following apply:

- players are restricted to members of a club or organisation or their guests
- winnings or stakes do not exceed £500 on any one day, or £7,500 within any period of 4 or 5 weeks, ending on the last Sunday of each calendar month

Bingo played remotely (for example, over the internet) is liable to Remote Gaming Duty. This must also be paid on bingo offered to the United Kingdom remotely from offshore.
