= Tobacco tax =

Excise tax on tobacco products

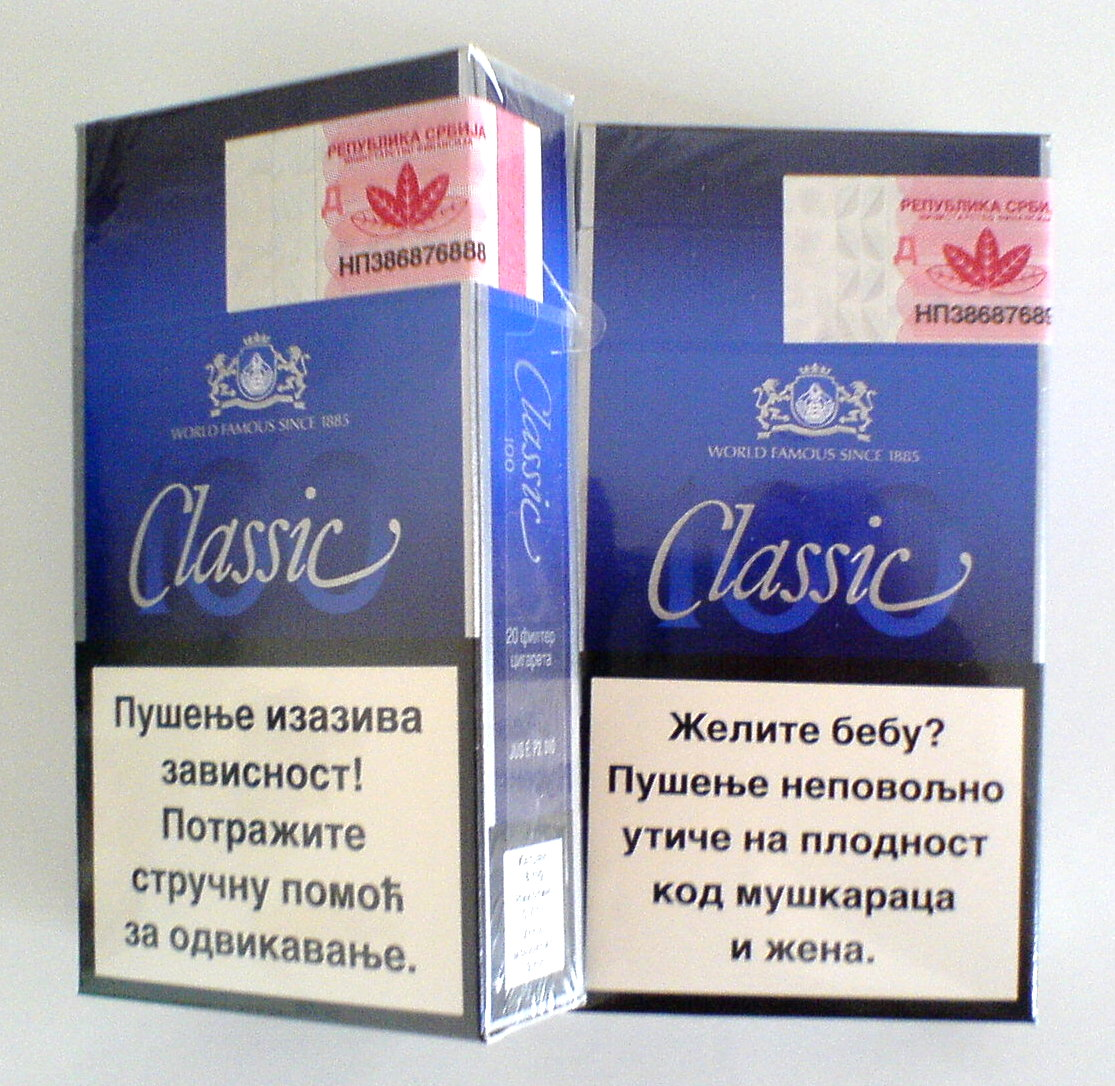
Serbian tax stamps on cigarette packets

Tobacco taxation is the excise tax on cigarettes and other tobacco products.

Tobacco taxation is the most effective tobacco control measure. It is used by many governments to generate revenue and to reduce tobacco consumption. On average, a 10% price increase reduces cigarette consumption by 4% to 5%. Many jurisdictions require tobacco products to be fixed with a tax stamp as evidence of payment.

Its revenue can contribute to the general government budget and/or be used to cover health costs of tobacco smoking. The World Health Organization recommends a minimum 75% tax share of the retail price of tobacco, as a way of deterring cancer, cardiovascular diseases and other negative health outcomes.

== Impact ==
Substantial scientific evidence confirms that higher cigarette prices result in lower overall cigarette consumption (elasticity). Most studies indicate that a 10% price increase reduces cigarette consumption by 4% in developed countries and 5% in developing countries. Youth, minorities, and low-income smokers are two to three times more likely to quit or smoke less than other smokers in response to price increases.

In 2016, the World Health Organization reported that increases in the cost of and taxes on tobacco products are "the single most consistently effective tool for reducing tobacco use". It was noted that current and potential users were dissuaded from consuming tobacco due to its high price, and this trend was observed more in young people than old people. Additionally, the demand for tobacco products was just as responsive to changes in price in lower-income countries as it was in high-income countries.

Research also shows that tobacco taxation can have a measurable impact on public health targets very fast, as early as within 4 months.

== Structure ==
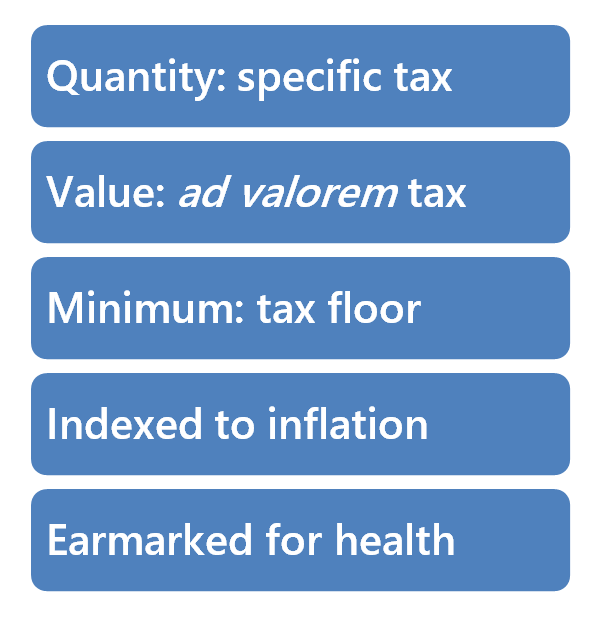
Possible elements of tobacco taxation include: specific tax, ad valorem tax, tax floor, indexation to inflation and earmarking for health programmes.

The World Health Organization finds that different structures of tobacco excise taxes are used worldwide. More specific taxes are often enforced in higher income countries, while lower income countries typically impose ad valorem taxes. Tax rates may vary based on tobacco product price and characteristics, such as weight, production or sales volume, or size. More complex taxation systems are found to offer more opportunities for tax avoidance and are considered less effective in terms of public health.

Less than 45% of a cigarette's cost is accounted for in excise taxes on average, and all taxes put together make up more than half its price. These taxes are higher in high-income countries. In addition to taxes, other price policies include price promotion restrictions and minimum price laws.

The tobacco industry responds to tax policies with sophisticated pricing tactics to maximise tobacco consumption and profits. The strategies include differentially shifting taxes between products, changing product attributes or launching new products and sales promotion.

== By country ==
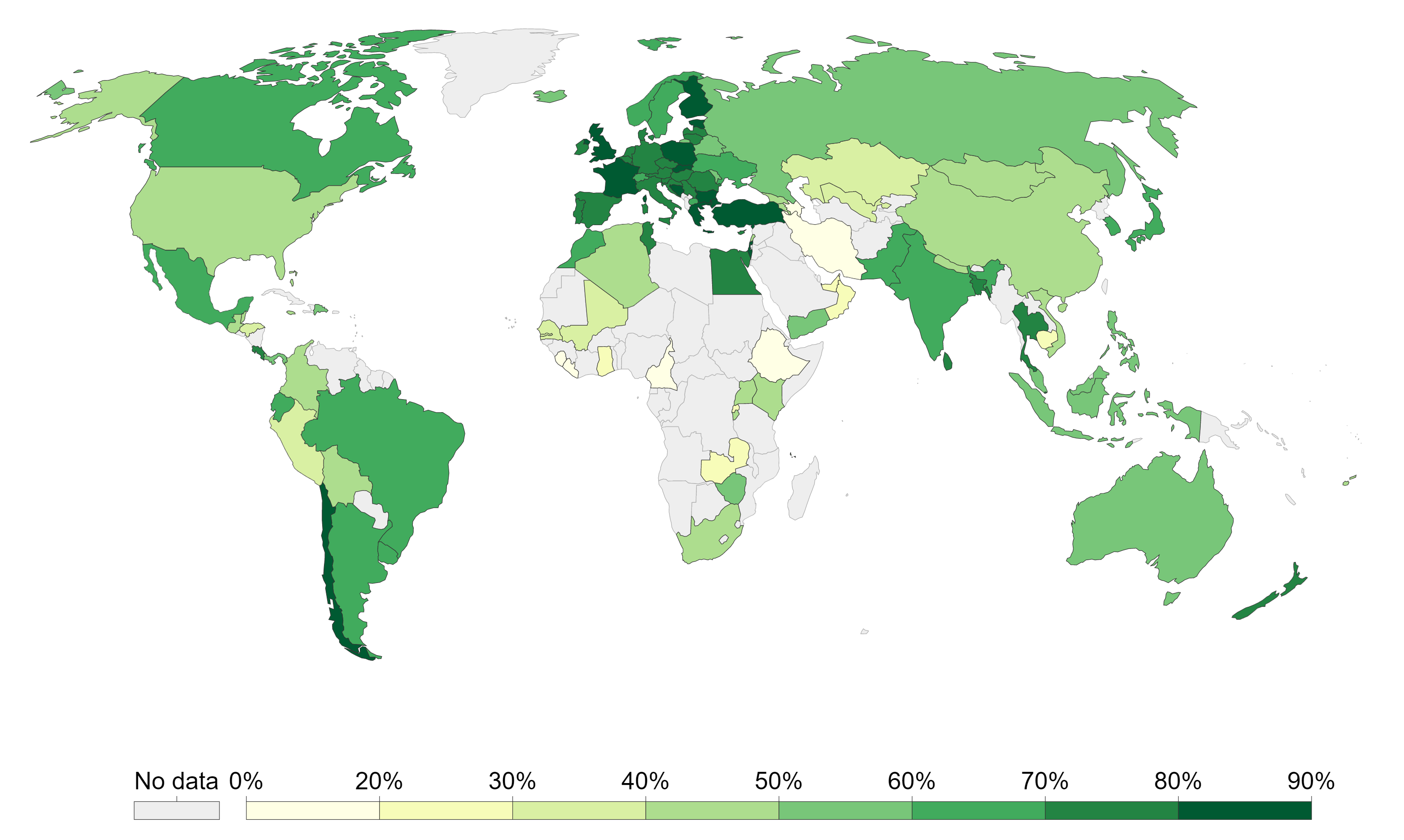
Taxes as a share of cigarette price, in 2014.

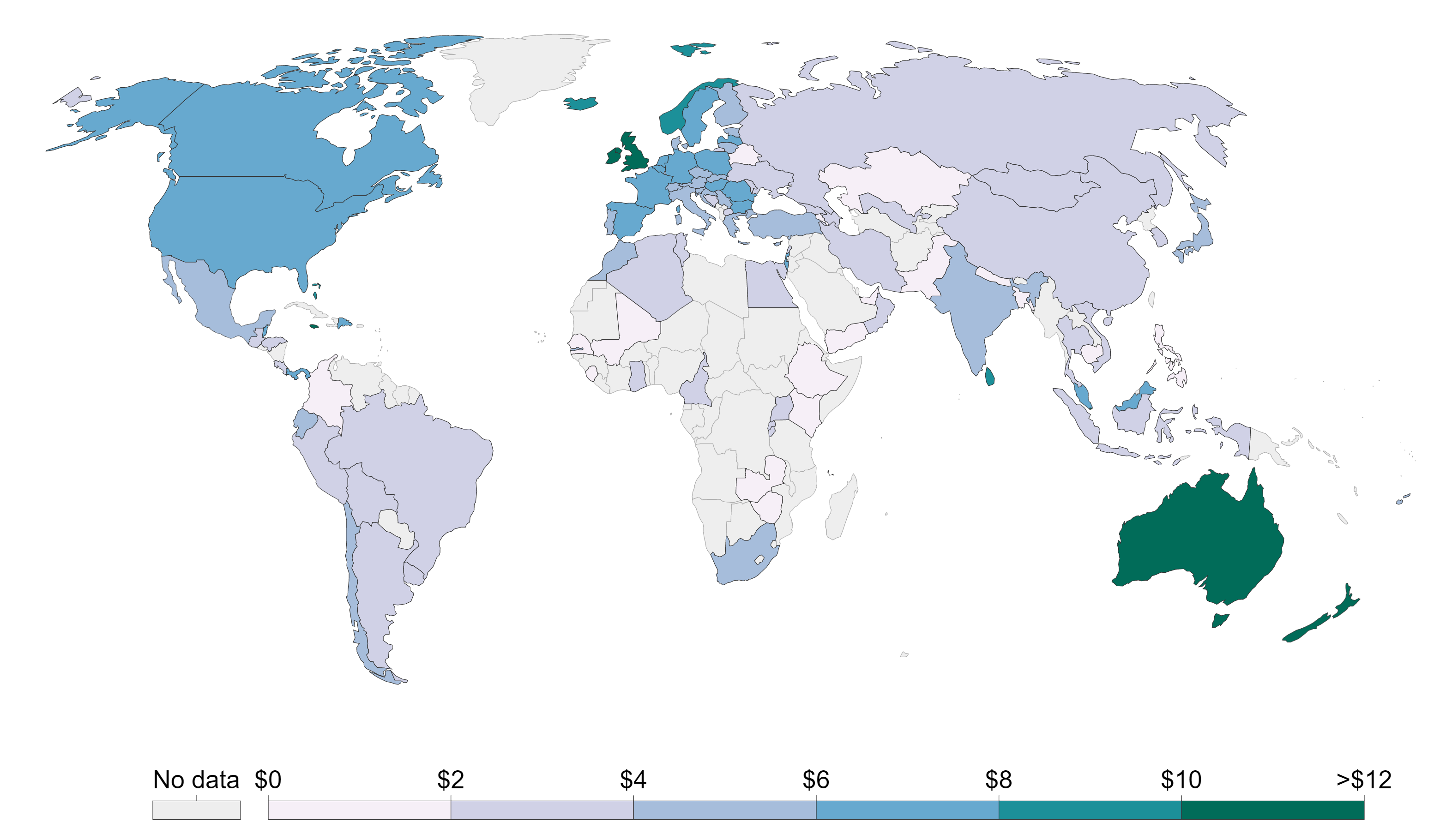
Average price of a pack of 20 cigarettes, measured in international dollars, in 2014.

=== Australia ===
In Australia, total taxes accounted for 63% of the final price of a packet of cigarettes (2011 figures). These taxes include federal excise or customs duty and Goods and Services Tax. As a result of the increase in taxation of tabacco products by 60%, the amount of taxes collected via tobacco sharply dropped from 16,3 billion AUD in 2020 to an estimated 5,5 billion in 2026.

=== Brazil ===
In Brazil, taxation on tobacco products is structured as a public health policy, combining revenue-raising objectives with strategies to reduce consumption, especially among young people and lower-income populations. The main tax levy is the Imposto sobre Produtos Industrializados (IPI), which can be applied under a general or special regime, combining ad valorem rates (percentages of the price) and specific amounts per unit sold. Under the general regime, the IPI is calculated using a rate of 300% on a base of 15% of the retail sales price, resulting in an effective tax burden of approximately 45% on the final product price.

Under the special regime, adopted by most of the sector, taxation combines an ad valorem component with a fixed specific amount per pack, which raises the total tax burden on cigarettes to levels ranging from approximately 69% to 83%, depending on the product’s price. In addition, Brazilian policy includes the establishment of minimum prices for cigarettes, a mechanism introduced by Law No. 12,546/2011 and subsequently updated, with the aim of preventing the sale of products at very low prices and thereby reducing access to consumption. Economic and public health evidence indicates that increasing taxes and prices is one of the most effective measures to reduce tobacco consumption, potentially leading to significant declines in demand, especially in middle-income countries such as Brazil. This effect occurs both by discouraging initiation into smoking and by encouraging cessation among smokers, in addition to contributing to increased government revenue to cover the social and health costs associated with smoking.

National studies also demonstrate that the economic impact of smoking in Brazil is high, with costs that significantly exceed the industry’s profits, reinforcing the role of taxation as an instrument of social compensation and public policy. More recently, Brazilian tax reform began to provide for the imposition of a selective tax, known as a "sin tax", on tobacco products, formally recognizing their harmful nature to health and expanding the potential to discourage consumption. Finally, experts point out that consistent tax policies that are updated over time are essential to maintaining the effectiveness of these measures, ensuring both a reduction in consumption and a balance between tax revenue and tobacco-related social costs.

=== United Kingdom ===
In the United Kingdom, as of March 2026, a packet of 20 cigarettes has a tax added of 16.5% of the retail price plus £7.07. The UK has a significant black market for tobacco, and it has been estimated by the tobacco industry that 27% of cigarette and 68% of handrolling tobacco consumption is non-UK duty paid (NUKDP).

=== United States ===
Tobacco taxation is one of the key force driving down smoking in the United States.

In 2002, the Centers for Disease Control and Prevention said that each pack of cigarettes sold in the United States costs the nation more than $7 in medical care and lost productivity, around $3400 per year per smoker. Another study by a team of health economists finds that the combined price paid by their families and society is about $41 per pack of cigarettes.

In the United States, states are a primary determinant of the total tax rate on cigarettes. Generally, states that rely on tobacco as a significant farm product tend to tax cigarettes at a low rate. Coupled with the federal cigarette tax of $1.01 per pack, cigarette-specific taxes range from $1.18 per pack in Missouri to $8.00 per pack in Silver Bay, New York. As part of the Family Smoking Prevention and Tobacco Control Act, the federal government collects user fees to fund Food and Drug Administration (FDA) regulatory measures over tobacco.

Cigarette taxes vary widely from state to state in the United States. For example, Missouri has a cigarette tax of only 17 cents per pack, the nation's lowest, while New York has the highest cigarette tax in the United States: $4.35 per pack. In Alabama, Illinois, Missouri, New York City, Tennessee, and Virginia, counties and cities may impose an additional limited tax on the price of cigarettes. Sales taxes are also levied on tobacco products in most jurisdictions.

== See also ==
- Cigarette tax stamp
- Demerit good
- Effect of taxes and subsidies on price
- Excise
- Frank Chaloupka
- Pigovian tax
- Tobacco politics
