= Machine Games Duty =

Tax in the United Kingdom

Machine Games Duty is a tax in the United Kingdom. It is payable for each premises which hosts slot machines.

It was introduced on 1 February 2013, replacing VAT and Amusement Machine Licence Duty.

Revenue peaked at £720m in the fiscal year 2018-2019, but has since declined.
