= Ad valorem tax =

Tax based on value of transaction

An ad valorem tax (Latin for "according to value") is a tax whose amount is based on the value of a transaction or of a property. It is typically imposed at the time of a transaction, as in the case of a sales tax or value-added tax (VAT). An ad valorem tax may also be imposed annually, as in the case of a real or personal property tax, or in connection with another significant event (e.g., inheritance tax, expatriation tax, or tariff). In some countries, a stamp duty is imposed as an ad valorem tax.

== Operation ==
All ad valorem taxes are collected according to the determined value of the taxed item. In the most common application of ad valorem taxes, namely municipal property taxes, public tax assessors regularly assess the property owner's real estate in order to determine its current value.

The determined value of the property is used to calculate the annual tax collected by the municipality or any other government entity upon the property owner. Ad valorem taxes are based on real property ownership and can therefore be compared with transaction taxes (i.e., sales taxes). Ad valorem tax is determined and collected every year, while a transaction tax is only levied at the time of the transaction.

=== Collection ===
Municipalities usually collect property ad valorem taxes, but they are levied also by government entities; examples are counties, school districts, or special taxation zones, also known as special purpose zones. Many entities can collect ad valorem taxes from the property owners; for example, a city and a county. Ad valorem property taxes are usually the main source of income for state and municipal governments. Municipal property ad valorem taxes are often referred to as "property taxes".

=== Tax value ===
Generally, starting from January 1 of each year, the tax assessment used to determine ad valorem taxes is calculated. Ad valorem tax as a percentage of the value of the assessed property, usually the fair market value of the property. Fair market price refers to the estimated selling price of the property. It is assumed that both willing buyers and sellers have the willingness to trade, and both parties have a reasonable understanding of all relevant facts about the property, and both parties are not obliged to complete the transaction. Fair market value can be seen as just a reasonable price.

== Examples ==
There are different ad valorem taxes and they are based in some cases on the ownership of real assets ( i.e. , property tax), or alternatively they can be "transactional taxes", e.g. sales tax. Property taxes usually are determined and collected with annual incidence, while transactional taxes take place at the time when the transaction occurs.

=== Land value tax ===
With land value taxes (LVT), which are a form of ad valorem tax, just the value of the land itself is taxed. Buildings, personal property and any kind of decoration are ignored by the following tax. LVT is different from other real estate taxes. Practically speaking, every jurisdiction collecting real estate property tax includes a land value tax, since land value has a meaningful impact on the overall property value. In 1879, Henry George published Progress and Poverty, by which he advocated a flat tax on lands based on the original unimproved value of the latters in their natural state, the "land value tax". George believed this tax was sufficient to support all government programs, being substantially a "single tax".

The idea was, instead of taxing labor and capital, to tax the rent of land and natural opportunities, in order to regain the rent for public use. He pointed out that, in general, taxation will stifle production behavior: he thought that incomes taxation reduces people's motivation to earn an income, taxation of wheat reduces wheat production, and so on. However, taxing the value of unimproved land has different effects: it's possible to distinguish two different sources of value for a land, the natural value of the land and the value created by improving it (for example, by building value on the land). Since the value of unacquired land is not earned, neither land value nor land value tax will affect production behavior (Hooper 2008).

=== Sales tax ===
A sales tax is a consumption tax charged at the point of purchase for certain goods and services. The tax is usually set as a percentage by the government charging the tax. There is usually a list of exemptions. The tax can be included in the price (tax-inclusive) or added at the point of sale (tax-exclusive).

Ideally, a sales tax is fair, has a high compliance rate, is difficult to avoid, is charged every time an item is sold retail, and is simple to calculate and simple to collect. A conventional or retail sales tax attempts to achieve this by charging the tax only on the final end user, unlike a gross receipts tax levied on the intermediate business which purchases materials for production or ordinary operating expenses prior to delivering a service or product to the marketplace. This prevents so-called tax "cascading" or "pyramiding", in which an item is taxed more than once as it makes its way from production to final retail sale. There are several types of sales taxes: seller or vendor taxes, consumer excise taxes, retail transaction taxes, or value-added taxes.

=== Value-added tax ===
A value-added tax (VAT), or goods and services tax (GST), is a tax on exchanges. It is levied on the added value that results from each exchange. It differs from a sales tax because a sales tax is levied on the total value of the exchange. For this reason, a VAT is neutral with respect to the number of passages that there are between the producer and the final consumer. A VAT is an indirect tax, in that the tax is collected from someone other than the person who actually bears the cost of the tax (namely the seller rather than the consumer). To avoid double taxation on final consumption, exports (which by definition are consumed abroad) are usually not subject to VAT, and the VAT charged under such circumstances is usually refundable.

==== History ====
The origin of the value-added tax is a debatable topic. It is variously ascribed to either German businessman Wilhelm von Siemens in 1918, or American economist Thomas S. Adams in his works between the years 1910-1921. Adams intended the VAT as a substitute for the business income tax and meant it not as an appendix to the federal income tax system in existence at the time but as its major alternative. In contrast the innovators in Germany thought of the VAT as a substitution for an already existing sales tax and as an adjunct to the tax on income.

Firstly VAT was introduced in France in 1954, but its usage was limited only to several cases. First full-scale VAT was put in place in Denmark in 1967. The spread of VAT was helped by the fact that European Union began to require members to adopt the VAT upon their entrance to the EU. Major influences in the spread of VAT outside of the EU are generally attributed to the IMF and the World Bank. Ironically the United States, who to this day do not have the VAT, promoted the tax largely in their post WWII occupation of Japan as well as in their advisory activities to developing economies.

=== Property tax ===
A property tax, millage tax is an ad valorem tax that an owner of real estate or other property pays on the value of the property being taxed. Ad valorem property taxes are collected by local government departments (examples are counties, cities, school districts, and special tax districts) on real property or personal property. Ad valorem property taxes are usually a main, if not the main, source of income for state and municipal governments. Municipal ad valorem property tax is often referred to as "property tax" for short. The owner of the property should pay this tax based on the value of the property.

Ad valorem taxes refer to goods or property taxes seen as a percentage of the sales price or estimated value. They belong to the assessed value range (because this is the only way to estimate the "sales price"). There are three species or types of property: Land, Improvements to Land (immovable man made things), and Personal (movable man made things).

Real estate, real property or realty are all terms for the combination of land and improvements. The taxing authority requires and/or performs an appraisal of the monetary value of the property, and tax is assessed in proportion to that value. Forms of property tax used vary between countries and jurisdictions. Usually, ad valorem taxes are calculated as a percentage of the estimated value of the considered property.

The estimated value of a property usually refers to the annual determination of the fair market value. "Fair market value" is generally defined as the price that willing buyers are willing to pay and the price of property that willing sellers are willing to accept, and neither price is forced to buy or sell.

It is also considered as the price at which a property changes hands between a potential buyer and a potential seller when both parties have reliable knowledge of all necessary facts and do not require buying or selling. Most tax authorities require regular inspections of the subject matter during the evaluation process and decide evaluation measures to determine fair market value.

Though, there is no uniform tax base that applies to all places. In some countries, property taxes are based on the value of the property depending on market value, site value, rental value. In different countries, taxes are calculated on building area and property area – called unit value. These methods can also be used in combination.

==== History ====
Property taxes have existed since the first ancient civilizations such as Mesopotamia, Babylon, Persia and China. Ancient Greece and ancient Rome also had various property taxes. One of the earliest well documented ad valorem taxes known in Europe is the Danegeld – a land-tax first imposed in 1012 in Britain to pay off Viking raiders. The amount of tax collected was based on the value of the taxpayer's property – usually measured by a local unit to determine the size of the land. Since the Danegeld became in time too complicated to collect, it was later replaced by Carucage, also a tax based on the size of land owned by the taxpayer.

== Application of a sales or property tax ==
=== United States ===
Ad valorem duties are important to those importing goods into the United States because the amount of duty owed is often based on the value of the imported commodity. Ad valorem taxes (mainly real property tax and sales taxes) are a major source of revenues for state and municipal governments, especially in jurisdictions that do not employ a personal income tax. Virtually all state and local sales taxes in the United States are ad valorem.

Ad valorem is used most frequently to refer to the value placed on property by the county tax assessors. An assessment is made against this value by applying an assessment rate (e.g. 100%, 60%, 40%, etc.). The net assessment is determined after subtracting any exemptions to which the property owner is entitled (e.g. homestead exemptions), and a tax or millage rate is applied to this net assessment to determine the ad valorem tax due from the property owner.

The two main basis for determining the ad valorem value are fair market value and current use value. The fair market value is based on the typical selling price for property on which the buyer and seller can agree, with the assumption that the property is being used or will be used at its highest and best use after the sale. The current use value is the typical selling price for property with an assumption that it will continue after the sale to be used in its current use rather than being converted to its highest and best use. State legislatures have created many variations to these two main valuation approaches.

In some states, a central appraisal authority establishes values on all properties and distributes these to the local county or jurisdiction taxing authority, which then sets a tax rate and imposes the local ad valorem tax. In other states, a central appraisal authority values certain properties that are difficult to value at the local level (e.g. railroads, electric companies and other utility companies) and sends these values to the local county or jurisdiction taxing authority, while the local tax assessors determine the value on all other property in the county or jurisdiction.

"Ad valorem" tax, most frequently referred to as property tax, relates to the tax that results when the net assessed value of a property is multiplied times the millage rate applicable to that property. This millage rate is usually expressed as a multiple of 1/1000 of a dollar. Thus the fractional amount of 0.001 will be expressed as 1 mill when expressed as an ad valorem tax millage rate.

The tax determined from multiplying the ad valorem assessment times the ad valorem tax rate is typically collected by the tax collector or tax commissioner.

== Application of a value-added tax ==
=== United Kingdom ===
The third largest source of government revenues is value-added tax (VAT), charged at the standard rate of 20% on supplies of goods and services. It is therefore a tax on consumer spending. Certain goods and services are exempt from VAT, and others are subject to VAT at a lower rate of 5% (the reduced rate) or 0% ("zero-rated").

=== Canada ===
The Goods and Services Tax (GST) (French: Taxe sur les produits et services, TPS) is a multi-level value-added tax introduced in Canada on January 1, 1991, by Prime Minister Brian Mulroney and finance minister Michael Wilson. The GST replaced a hidden 13.5% Manufacturers' Sales Tax (MST) because it hurt the manufacturing sector's ability to export. The introduction of the GST was very controversial. As of January 1, 2012, the GST stood at 5%.

As of July 1, 2010, the federal GST and the regional Provincial Sales Tax (PST) were 'harmonized' into a single value-added sales tax, called the Harmonized Sales Tax (HST). The HST came into effect in five of the ten Canadian provinces: British Columbia, Ontario, New Brunswick, Newfoundland and Labrador, and Nova Scotia. Prince Edward Island later entered into a similar agreement to harmonize and implement an HST in that province, while effective April 1, 2013, the Government of British Columbia eliminated the HST and reinstated PST and GST on taxable services provided in British Columbia.

=== Australia ===
The Goods and Services Tax is a value-added tax of 10% on most goods and services sold in Australia.

It was introduced by the Howard Government on 1 July 2000, replacing the previous federal wholesale sales tax system and designed to phase out the various state and territory taxes such as banking taxes, stamp duty and land value tax. While this was the stated intent at the time, the States still charge duty on a various transactions, including but not limited to vehicle transfers and land transfers, insurance contracts and agreements for the sale of land. Many States, such as Western Australia, have made recent amendments to duties laws to phase out particular duties and clarify existing ones. The Duties Act 2008 (WA) is available online at the Western Australian State Law Publisher

=== New Zealand ===
The Goods and Services Tax is a value-added tax of 15% on most goods and services sold in New Zealand.

It was introduced by the Fourth Labour Government on 1 October 1986 at a rate of 10%. This was increased to 12.5% on 1 July 1989 and 15% on 1 October 2010.

=== Europe ===
A common VAT system is compulsory for the member states of the European Union. The EU VAT system is imposed by a series of European Union directives, the most important of which is the Sixth VAT Directive (Directive 77/388/EC). Nevertheless, some member states have negotiated variable rates (Madeira in Portugal) or VAT exemption for regions or territories. The regions below fall out of the scope of EU VAT:

- Åland (Finland)
- Heligoland island, Büsingen am Hochrhein territory (Germany)
- Guadeloupe, Martinique, French Guiana, Réunion (France)
- Mount Athos (Greece)
- Ceuta, Melilla, The Canary Islands (Spain)
- Livigno, Campione d'Italia, Lake Lugano (Italy)
- Gibraltar, The Channel Islands (United Kingdom)

Under the EU system of VAT, where a person carrying on an economic activity supplies goods and services to another person, and the value of the supplies passes financial limits, the supplier is required to register with the local taxation authorities and charge its customers, and account to the local taxation authority for VAT (although the price may be inclusive of VAT, so VAT is included as part of the agreed price, or exclusive of VAT, so VAT is payable in addition to the agreed price).

VAT that is charged by a business and paid by its customers is known as output VAT (that is, VAT on its output supplies). VAT that is paid by a business to other businesses on the supplies that it receives is known as input VAT (that is, VAT on its input supplies). A business is generally able to recover input VAT to the extent that the input VAT is attributable to (that is, used to make) its taxable outputs. Input VAT is recovered by setting it against the output VAT for which the business is required to account to the government, or, if there is an excess, by claiming a repayment from the government.

Different rates of VAT apply in different EU member states. The minimum standard rate of VAT throughout the EU is 15%, although reduced rates of VAT, as low as 5%, are applied in various states on various sorts of supply (for example, domestic fuel and power in the UK). The maximum rate in the EU is 25%.

The Sixth VAT Directive requires certain goods and services to be exempt from VAT (for example, postal services, medical care, lending, insurance, betting), and certain other goods and services to be exempt from VAT but subject to the ability of an EU member state to opt to charge VAT on those supplies (such as land and certain financial services). Input VAT that is attributable to exempt supplies is not recoverable, although a business can increase its prices so the customer effectively bears the cost of the 'sticking' VAT (the effective rate will be lower than the headline rate and depend on the balance between previously taxed input and labour at the exempt stage).

Finally, some goods and services are "zero-rated". The zero-rate is a positive rate of tax calculated at 0%. Supplies subject to the zero-rate are still "taxable supplies", i.e. they have VAT charged on them. In the UK, examples include most food, books, drugs, and certain kinds of transport. The zero-rate is not featured in the EU Sixth Directive as it was intended that the minimum VAT rate throughout Europe would be 5%. However, zero-rating remains in some Member States, most notably the UK, as a legacy of pre-EU legislation. These Member States have been granted a derogation to continue existing zero-rating but cannot add new goods or services. The UK also exempts or lowers the rate on some products depending on situation; for example milk products are exempt from VAT, but if you go into a restaurant and drink a milk drink it is VAT-able. Some products such as feminine hygiene products and baby products (nappies etc.) are charged at 5% VAT along with domestic fuel.

When goods are imported into the EU from other states, VAT is generally charged at the border, at the same time as customs duty. "Acquisition" VAT is payable when goods are acquired in one EU member state from another EU member state (this is done not at the border but through an accounting mechanism). EU businesses are often required to charge themselves VAT under the reverse charge mechanism where services are received from another member state or from outside of the EU.

Businesses can be required to register for VAT in EU member states, other than the one in which they are based, if they supply goods via mail order to those states, over a certain threshold. Businesses that are established in one member state but which receive supplies in another member state may be able to reclaim VAT charged in the second state under the provisions of the Eighth VAT Directive (Directive 79/1072/EC). To do so, businesses have a value added tax identification number. A similar directive, the Thirteenth VAT Directive (Directive 86/560/EC), also allows businesses established outside the EU to recover VAT in certain circumstances.

Following changes introduced on July 1, 2003, (under Directive 2002/38/EC), non-EU businesses providing digital electronic commerce and entertainment products and services to EU countries are also required to register with the tax authorities in the relevant EU member state, and to collect VAT on their sales at the appropriate rate, according to the location of the purchaser. Alternatively, under a special scheme, non-EU businesses may register and account for VAT on only one EU member state. This produces distortions as the rate of VAT is that of the member state of registration, not where the customer is located, and an alternative approach is therefore under negotiation, whereby VAT is charged at the rate of the member state where the purchaser is located.

The differences between different rates of VAT was often originally justified by certain products being "luxuries" and thus bearing high rates of VAT, whereas other items were deemed to be "essentials" and thus bearing lower rates of VAT. However, often high rates persisted long after the argument was no longer valid. For instance, France taxed cars as a luxury product (33%) up into the 1980s, when most of the French households owned one or more cars. Similarly, in the UK, clothing for children is "zero rated" whereas clothing for adults is subject to VAT at the standard rate of 20%.

== Analysis ==
Starting with the land-value vax, since it is believed that the market usually redistributes resources functionally, the best tax is the one that causes the least distortion of market incentives; land value tax meets this standard. In addition, the land's value in a certain locality will be influenced by local government services, so it may be considered fair to tax landowners in proportion to the value of the proceeds received to finance these services. Henry George is correct that other taxes may have a stronger inhibitory effect but now a single land tax is not recognized innocent by economists. The site value is created, not inherent.

A tax on the value of the site is actually a tax on the production potential, that is the consequence of land improvement in the area. In 1879 Henry George proposed to impose a tax on a piece of land based on the improvement of adjacent land. Murray Rothbard believes that a "neutral tax" is the best thing to make the market free and without problems.The low-income earners have the biggest burden because consumption taxes (i.e. sales tax and value-added tax) are regressive. To compensate for this, taxes on necessities are usually lower than taxes on luxury goods. Supporters of this kind of taxation believe that it is an effective way to increase income and reduce income tax accordingly. Opponents believe that, as a diminishing tax, it places too much burden on the low-income earners. When the tax burden is borne by the producers, Murray N. Rothbard paraphrases the French economist Jean-Baptiste Say's conclusions as "taxes, over time, cripple production itself". As some form of taxation is necessary to finance public institutions serving society, such taxation should be fair and helpful. Say said, "The best scheme of finance is, to spend as little as possible; and the best tax is always the lightest." At the end, the challenge is to guarantee that ad valorem taxes do not cause more problems than other forms of taxation (i.e. income tax).

== Impact ==
The theory of the firm shows that taxes on transfers can encourage firms to internalize costs and grow, whereas the absence of such transactions may result in a larger number of individually smaller firms. For example, a sales tax – unlike a VAT – would realign the incentives of a steel mill in favor of operating its own coal mine, as opposed to simply buying coal in a transaction subject to taxation; the theory of the firm's model suggests that this would be less economically efficient as it results in a decline in specialization.

== See also ==
- Georgism
- Haig–Simons income
- Land value tax

== Sources ==
- George, Henry (1997) [1879]. Progress and Poverty. Robert Schalkenbach Foundation. ISBN 978-0911312584.
- Hooper, Charles L. (2008). "Henry George (1839-1897)". The Concise Encyclopedia of Economics.
- Rothbard, Murray N. (1994). Rothbard, Murray N. (ed.). "The Consumption Tax: A Critique". Review of Austrian Economics. 7 (2): 75–90.
- Rothbard, Murray (2004). Man, Economy, and State (Scholar's ed.). Auburn, Alabama: The Ludwig von Mises Institute. ISBN 978-0945466307.
- Say, Jean-Baptiste (2001) [1st pub. 1880]. A Treatise On Political Economy (PDF). Batoche Books.
