= Veblen good =

Luxury good for which the demand increases as the price increases

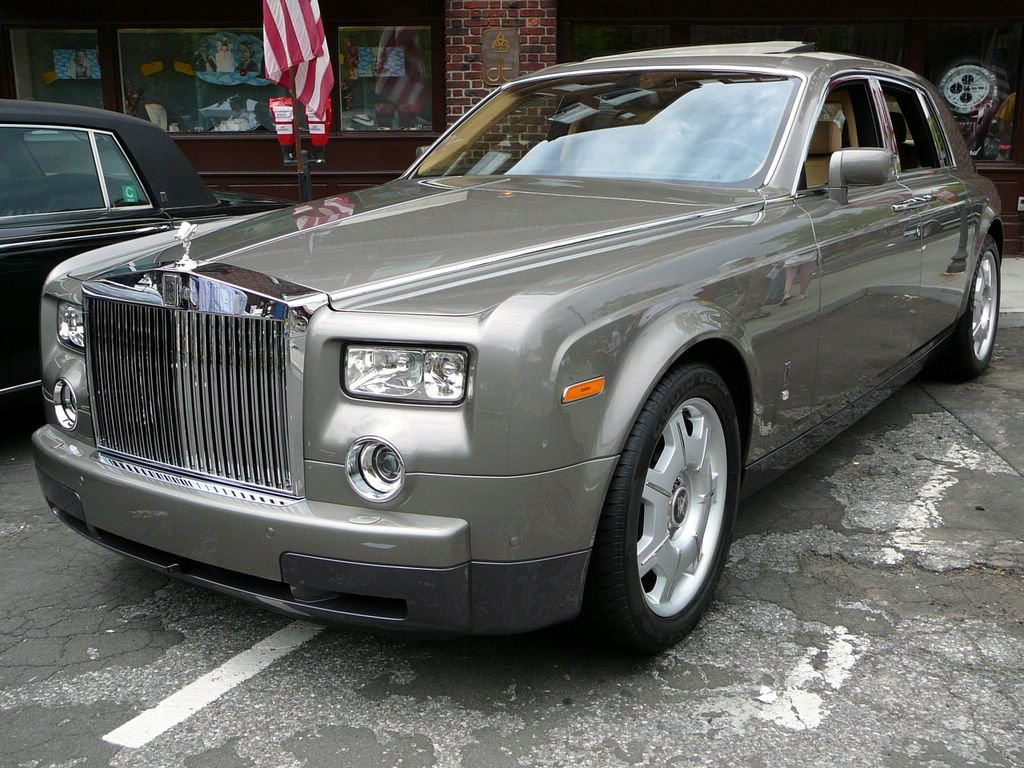
Veblen goods such as luxury cars are considered desirable consumer products for conspicuous consumption because of, rather than despite, their high prices.

A Veblen good is a type of luxury good for which the demand increases as the price increases, in apparent contradiction of the law of demand, resulting in an upward-sloping demand curve. They are named after American economist Thorstein Veblen who described the contradiction.

The higher prices of Veblen goods may make them desirable as a status symbol in the practices of conspicuous consumption and conspicuous leisure. A product may be a Veblen good because it is a positional good, something few others can own.

== Background ==
Veblen first identified conspicuous consumption as a mode of status-seeking (i.e., keeping up with the Joneses) in The Theory of the Leisure Class (1899). The testability of this theory was questioned by Colin Campbell due to the lack of complete honesty from research participants. However, research in 2007 studying the effect of social comparison on human brains can be used as an evidence supporting Veblen. The idea that seeking status can be an incentive to spend was also later discussed by Fred Hirsch.

Additionally, there have been different arguments on whether Veblen’s theory applies only to luxury goods or all goods.

== Analysis ==
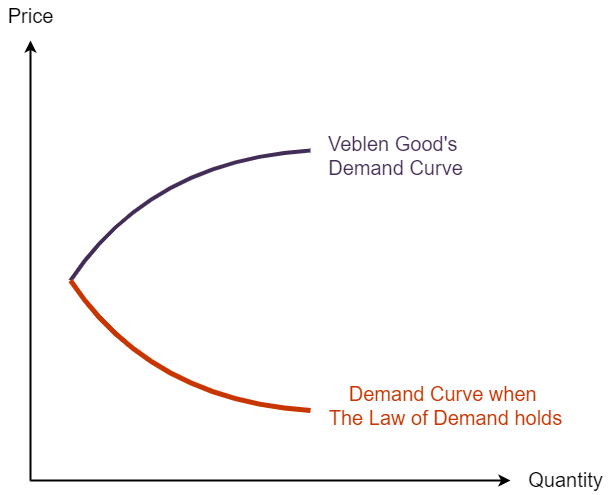
Veblen goods have an upward-sloping demand curve.

A corollary of the Veblen effect is that lowering the price may increase the demand at first, but will decrease the quantity demanded afterwards.

The following concepts can explain the existence of Veblen goods:

- Pecuniary emulation (or pecuniary success), which leads to invidious comparison (or invidious distinction).
- Relative consumption trap.
- The inverse relationship between one’s well-being with another’s income.
- The suppression of explicit attempts to emphasize social status differences.

The theory of Veblen good made a significant contribution towards marketing and advertising. There are multiple studies considering Veblen goods as a tool to develop and maintain a strong relationship with consumers.

While Veblen goods are more affordable for high income households and affluent societies are usually known as the targeted income groups of Veblen brands, they have been experiencing a trend away from conspicuous consumption.

== Ethical concerns ==
Being aware of the existence of Veblen goods, concerns were raised regarding their wastefulness as they are viewed as deadweight loss. Consuming Veblen goods also results in other financial and social consequences such as conspicuous demonstration of unequal wealth distribution and possible changes to optimal tax formulas. Another negative outcome is that this type of consumption can be a culprit of the future exacerbation of pollution.

Nonetheless, one exception is ethical consumers interested in virtue signaling through their consumption of goods and services. Veblen goods targeting this market segment must also be ethically manufactured to increase in their quantity demanded.

== Related concepts ==
The Veblen effect is one of a family of theoretical anomalies in the general law of demand in microeconomics. Related effects include:

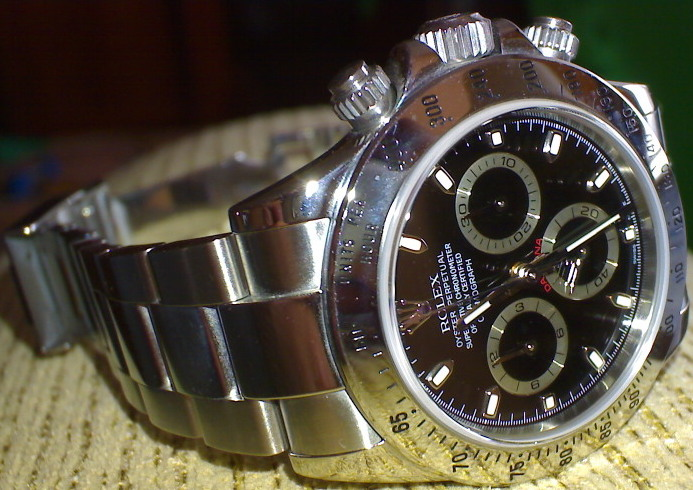
The stainless steel Rolex Daytona frequently sells for over its list price.

- The snob effect: expressed preference for goods because they are different from those commonly preferred; in other words, the demand for a certain good by individuals of a higher income level is inversely related to its demand by those of a lower income level.
- The common law of business balance: the low price of a good is believed by many to indicate that the producer may have compromised quality, that is, "you get what you pay for".
- The hot-hand fallacy: stock buyers have fallen prey to the fallacy that previous price increases suggest future price increases. Other rationales for buying a high-priced stock are that previous buyers who bid up the price are proof of the issue's quality, or conversely, that an issue's low price may be evidence of viability problems.

== Bandwagon effect ==
Sometimes, the value of goods increases as the number of buyers (or particular group of buyers and users) increases. This is called the bandwagon effect when it depends on the psychology of buying a product because it seems popular, or the network effect when numerous buyers or users itself increases the value of goods. For example, as the number of people with telephones or Facebook accounts increased, the value of having a telephone or a Facebook account increased, because users of those could reach more people. However, neither of these effects suggests that raising the price would boost demand at a given level of saturation.

== Relationship with laws of demand and supply ==
Economist Harvey Leibenstein defined the term "Veblen effect" in a 1950 article, "Bandwagon, Snob, and Veblen Effects in the Theory of Consumers' Demand". Counter-examples have been called the counter-Veblen effect. The counter-Veblen effect occurs when preference for goods increases with the decrease in their price, thereby outperforming the supply and demand effect, as a result of conspicuous thrift amongst some consumers.

The effect on demand depends on the range of other goods available, their prices, and whether they serve as substitutes for the goods in question. The effects are anomalies within demand theory, because the theory normally assumes that preferences are independent of price or the number of units being sold. They are therefore collectively referred to as interaction effects.

Interaction effects are a different kind of anomaly from that posed by Giffen goods. The Giffen goods theory is one for which observed quantity demanded rises as price rises. Still, the effect arises without any interaction between price and preference—it results from the interplay of the income effect and the substitution effect of a price change.

== See also ==
- Choice-supportive bias
- Commodity fetishism
- Consumer surplus
- Normal good
- Inferior good
- Easterlin paradox
- Giffen good
- Surplus economics
