= Ordinary good =

Conceptual type of goods in microeconomics

An ordinary good is a microeconomic concept used in consumer theory. It is defined as a good which creates an increase in quantity demanded when the price for the good drops or conversely a decrease in quantity demanded if the price for the good increases, ceteris paribus. It is the opposite of a Giffen good.

Since the existence of Giffen goods outside the realm of economic theory is still contested, the pairing of Giffen goods with ordinary goods has gotten less traction in economics textbooks than the pairing normal good/inferior good used to distinguish responses to income changes. The usage of "ordinary good" is still useful since it allows a simple representation of price and income changes. A normal good is always ordinary, while an ordinary good can be a normal good, an inferior good or "sticky". In economics, "stickiness" describes a situation in which a nominal price is slow to adjust or resistant to change.

== Distinction between income and price effects ==
| Income change | | | Price change | | |
| | Normal good | Inferior good | | Ordinary good | Giffen good |
| Income up | Consumption up | Consumption down | Price up | Consumption down | Consumption up |
| Income down | Consumption down | Consumption up | Price down | Consumption up | Consumption down |

== See also ==
- Supply and demand
- Consumer theory
- Giffen good
- Inferior good
- Normal good
- Capital good
