= Vernee =

Chinese smartphone brand

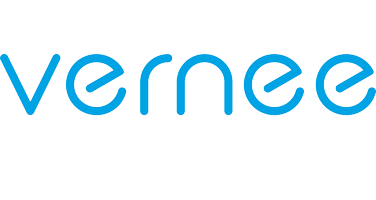
- Product type: Smartphones
- Current owner: Shenzhen New-Bund Network Technology Co,. Ltd.
- Country: China
- Introduced: February 2016
- Discontinued: February 2020
- Website: https://www.vernee.cc

Vernee was a brand of cellphones produced by the China based Shenzhen New-Bund Network Technology Co., Ltd. The brand was founded in February 2016, marking the first step of New-bund's transfer from OEM/ODM to public market. Vernee phones use the Android operating system.

The company has pricing policies that allow them to put mid range hardware on low end Prices, accompanied with Android OS.

Vernee uploaded their last YouTube has been uploaded on 11 February, with no videos or products after that. Their website is offline since February 2020.

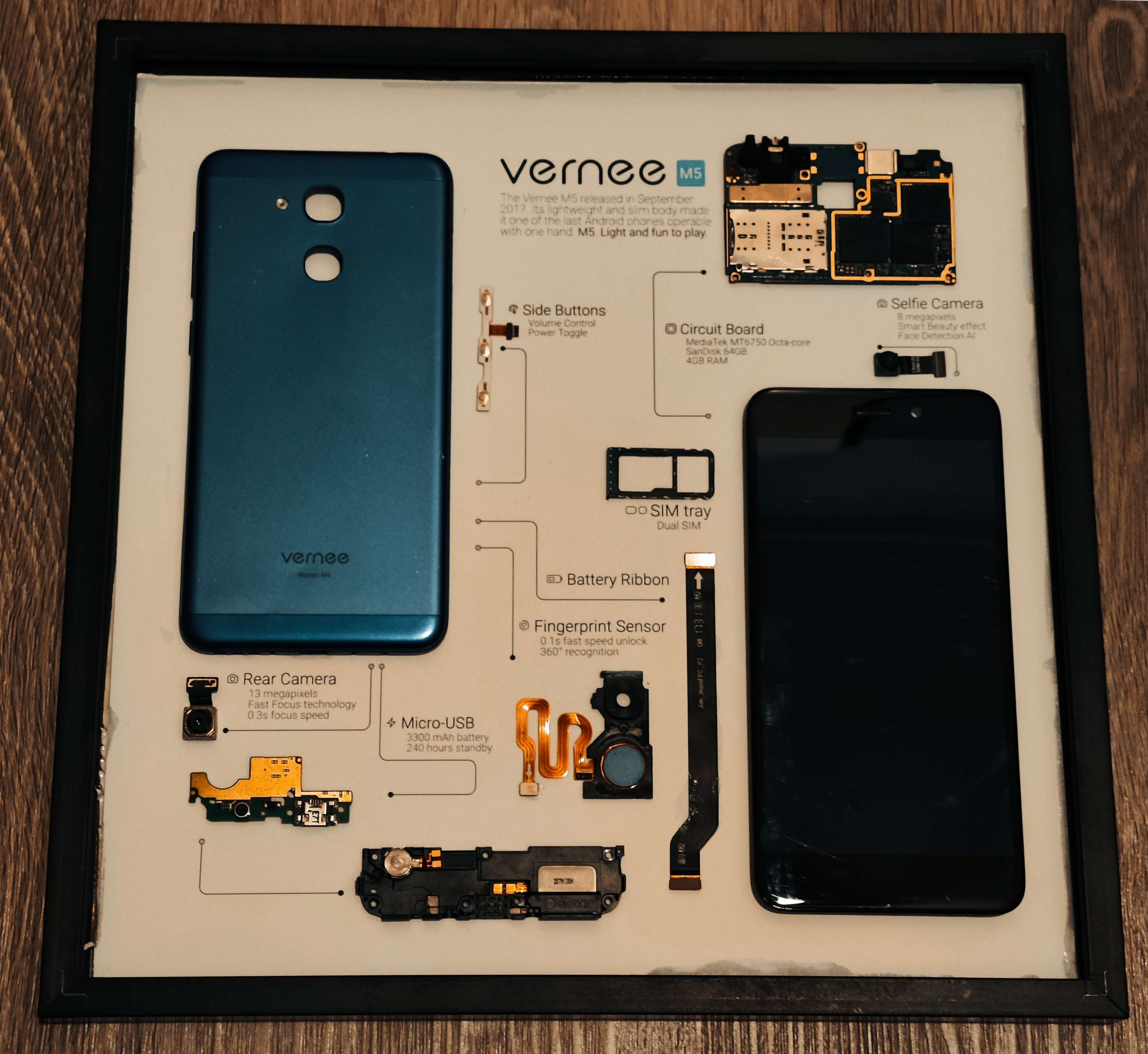
Disassembled Vernee M5

== List of smartphones ==
Phones
Names	Models	Sub-Model	Year
Vernee	Active		2017
Vernee	Apollo		2016
Vernee	Apollo	Lite	2016
Vernee	Apollo	X	2017
Vernee	Apollo 2		2017
Vernee	M3		2018
Vernee	M5		2017
Vernee	M6		2018
Vernee	Mars		2016
Vernee	Mars	Pro	2016
Vernee	Mix	2	2017
Vernee	Thor		2016
Vernee	Thor	E	2017
Vernee	Thor	Plus	2017
Vernee	V2	Pro	2018
Vernee	X		2017
Vernee	X1		2018
Vernee	T3	Pro	2018
Vernee	X2		2019
