= Necessity good =

Products bought regardless of income

Engels curves showing income elasticity of demand (YED) of normal goods (comprising luxury (red) and necessity goods (yellow)), perfectly inelastic (green) and inferior goods (blue)

In economics, a necessity good or a necessary good is a type of normal good, and they are usually classified as an inferior good. Necessity goods are product(s) and services that consumers will buy regardless of the changes in their income levels, therefore making these products less sensitive to income change. Necessity goods are goods or services which are indispensable to humans, such as food, water, or shelter. Necessity goods often do not have close substitute goods.

As for any other normal good, an income rise will lead to a rise in demand, but the increase for a necessity good is less than proportional to the rise in income, so the proportion of expenditure on these goods falls as income rises. If income elasticity of demand is lower than unity, it is a necessity good. This observation for food, known as Engel's law, states that as income rises, the proportion of income spent on food falls, even if absolute expenditure on food rises. This makes the income elasticity of demand for food between zero and one.

Some necessity goods are produced by a public utility or by state-owned monopolies. According to Investopedia, stocks of private companies producing necessity goods are known as defensive stocks. Defensive stocks are stocks that provide a constant dividend and stable earnings regardless of the state of the overall stock market.

The opposite of a necessity good is a luxury good, which in economics is a "good or service whose consumption rises more than in proportion to rises in income."

== See also ==
- Basic needs
- Income elasticity of demand
- Wealth (economics)
