= Giffen good =

Product that people consume more of as the price rises

Indifference map with two budget lines (red) depending on the price of Giffen good x

In microeconomics and consumer theory, a Giffen good is a product that people consume more of as the price rises and vice versa, violating the law of demand.

For ordinary goods, as the price of the good rises, the substitution effect makes consumers purchase less of it, and more of substitute goods; the income effect can either reinforce or weaken this decline in demand, but for an ordinary good never outweighs it. By contrast, a Giffen good is so strongly an inferior good (in higher demand at lower incomes) that the contrary income effect more than offsets the substitution effect, and the net effect of the good's price rise is to increase demand for it. This phenomenon is known as the Giffen paradox.

== Background ==
Types of goods in economics

Giffen goods are named after Scottish economist Sir Robert Giffen, to whom Alfred Marshall attributed this idea in his book Principles of Economics, first published in 1890. Giffen first proposed the paradox from his observations of the purchasing habits of the Victorian-era poor.

Etsusuke Masuda and Peter Newman suggested that Simon Gray described "Gray goods" in his 1815 text entitled The Happiness of States: Or An Inquiry Concerning Population, The Modes of Subsisting and Employing It, and the Effects of All on Human Happiness. The chapter entitled "A Rise in the Price of Bread Corn, beyond a certain Pitch, tends to increase the Consumption of it," contains a detailed account of what have come to be called Giffen goods, and which might better be called Gray goods. They also note that George Stigler corrected Marshall's misattribution in a 1947 journal article on the history.

== Analysis ==
For almost all products, the demand curve has a negative slope: as the price increases, quantity demanded for the good decreases.

Giffen goods are the exception to this general rule. Unlike other goods or services, the price point at which supply and demand meet results in higher prices and greater demand whenever market forces recognize a change in supply and demand for Giffen goods. As a result, when price goes up, the quantity demanded also goes up. To be a true Giffen good, the good's price must be the only thing that changes to produce a change in quantity demanded.

Giffen goods are distinct from Veblen goods, which are products whose demand increases if their price increases because the price is seen as an indicator of quality or status.

The classic example given by Marshall is of inferior quality staple foods, whose demand is driven by poverty that prevents their purchasers from affording superior foodstuffs. As the price of the cheap staple rises, they can no longer afford to supplement their diet with better foods, and must consume more of the staple food.

As Mr. Giffen has pointed out, a rise in the price of bread makes so large a drain on the resources of the poorer labouring families and raises the marginal utility of money to them so much that they are forced to curtail their consumption of meat and the more expensive farinaceous foods: and, bread being still the cheapest food which they can get and will take, they consume more, and not less of it.

— Alfred Marshall, Principles of Economics (1895 ed.)

There are three necessary conditions for this situation to arise:

1. the good in question must be an inferior good,
2. there must be a lack of close substitute goods, and
3. the goods must constitute a substantial percentage of the buyer's income, but not such a substantial percentage that none of the associated normal goods are consumed.

If precondition #1 is changed to "The goods in question must be so inferior that the income effect is greater than the substitution effect" then this list defines necessary and sufficient conditions. The last condition is a condition on the buyer rather than the goods itself, and thus the phenomenon is also called a "Giffen behavior".

== Examples ==
Suppose a consumer has a budget of $6 per day that he spends on food. He must eat three meals a day, and there are only two options: the inferior good, bread, which costs $1 per meal, and the superior good, cake, which costs $4 per meal. Cake is always preferable to bread. At present, he would purchase 2 loaves of bread and one cake, completely exhausting his budget to fill 3 meals each day. Now, were the price of bread to rise from $1 to $2, then the consumer would have no choice but to give up cake, and spend his entire budget on 3 loaves of bread, in order to eat three meals a day. In this situation, his consumption of bread would have actually increased as a result of the price increase. Thus bread would be a Giffen good in this example.

== Empirical evidence ==
Evidence for the existence of Giffen goods has generally been limited. A 2008 paper by Robert Jensen and Nolan Miller argued rice and wheat noodles were Giffen goods in parts of China. Another 2008 paper by the same authors experimentally demonstrated the existence of Giffen goods among people at the household level by directly subsidizing purchases of rice and wheat flour for extremely poor families. In this paper, a 2007 field experiment was conducted in the provinces of Hunan and Gansu, where the staples were rice and wheat respectively. In both provinces, randomly selected households were offered their dietary staples at subsidized rates. After the completion of the project, it could be found that the demands from Hunan households who were offered the rice fell drastically. Meanwhile, the demands of wheat in Gansu implies weak evidence of the Giffen paradox.

In 1991, Battalio, Kagel, and Kogut published an article arguing that quinine water is a Giffen good for some lab rats. However, they could show the existence of a Giffen good only at an individual level and not the market level.

Giffen goods are difficult to study because the definition requires a number of observable conditions. One reason for the difficulty in studying market demand for Giffen goods is that Giffen originally envisioned a specific situation faced by poor individuals. Modern consumer behavior research methods often deal in aggregates that average out income levels, and are too blunt an instrument to capture these specific situations. Complicating the matter are the requirements that availability of substitutes be limited and that consumers be not so poor that they can only afford the inferior good. For this reason, many text books use the term Giffen paradox rather than Giffen good.

Some types of premium goods (such as expensive French wines, or celebrity-endorsed perfumes) are sometimes called Giffen goods via the claim that lowering the price of these high-status goods decreases demand because they are no longer perceived as exclusive or high-status products. However, to the extent that the perceived nature of such high-status goods actually changes significantly with a substantial price drop, this behavior disqualifies them from being considered Giffen goods, because the Giffen goods analysis assumes that only the consumer's income or the relative price level changes, not the nature of the good itself. If a price change modifies consumers' perception of the good, they should be analysed as Veblen goods. Some economists question the empirical validity of the distinction between Giffen and Veblen goods, arguing that whenever there is a substantial change in the price of a good its perceived nature also changes, since price is a large part of what constitutes a product. However, the theoretical distinction between the two types of analysis remains clear, and which to apply to a specific case is an empirical matter. Based on microeconomic consumer theory, it assumes that the consumer could value a good without knowing the price. However, when the consumers who were constrained by income and price must choose the optimal goods, the goods must be valued with available prices. Because, in some degrees, the higher price indicates higher values of goods offering to the consumers.

=== Great Famine in Ireland ===
Potatoes during the Irish Great Famine were once considered an example of a Giffen good. Along with the Famine, the price of potatoes and meat increased subsequently. Compared to meat, it is obvious that potatoes could be much cheaper as a staple food. Due to poverty, individuals could not afford meat anymore; therefore, demand for potatoes increased. Under such a situation, the supply curve will increase with rising potato prices, which is consistent with the definition of Giffen good. However, Gerald P. Dwyer and Cotton M. Lindsey challenged this idea in their 1984 article Robert Giffen and the Irish Potato, where they showed the contradicting nature of the Giffen "legend" with respect to historical evidence.

The Giffen nature of the Irish potato was also later discredited by Sherwin Rosen of the University of Chicago in his 1999 paper Potato Paradoxes. Rosen showed that the phenomenon could be explained by a normal demand model.

Charles Read has shown with quantitative evidence that bacon pigs showed Giffen-style behavior during the Irish Famine, but that potatoes did not.

=== Other proposed examples ===
Anthony Bopp (1983) proposed that kerosene, a low-quality fuel used in home heating, was a Giffen good. Schmuel Baruch and Yakar Kanai (2001) suggested that shochu, a Japanese distilled beverage, could be a Giffen good. In both cases, the authors offered supporting econometric evidence. However, this evidence is considered incomplete.

A good may be a Giffen good at the individual level but not at the aggregate level, or vice-versa. As shown by Hildenbrand's model, aggregate demand might not exhibit any Giffen behavior even when we assume the same preferences for each consumer, whose nominal wealth is uniformly distributed on an interval containing zero. This could explain the presence of Giffen behavior for individual consumers but the absence in aggregate data.

== See also ==
- Capital good
- Consumer choice
- Price elasticity of demand
