= Bennett's law =

Economic law

In agricultural economics and development economics, Bennett's law observes that as incomes rise, people eat relatively fewer calorie-dense starchy staple foods and relatively more nutrient-dense meats, oils, sweeteners, fruits, and vegetables. Bennett's law is related to Engel's law, which considers the relationship between rising household incomes and total food spending.

== History ==
The concept of the declining "starchy-staple ratio" originated in Merrill K. Bennett's 1941 paper, "International Contrasts in Food Consumption." The first published attribution of the concept to Bennett and naming as Bennett's law appears in the proceedings of a 1959 conference held by the American Society of Civil Engineers.

== Contemporary use and implications ==
Bennett's law is now a "well-established stylized fact" referenced in university textbooks, reports of the FAO and the World Bank, and many global food system models. It has particular relevance to the Nutrition Transition. One implication of Bennett's law is that global demand for animal-based foods is predicted to increase more rapidly than human population growth. Alternative dietary proposals such as the EAT-Lancet Commission's "Planetary diet" and new alternative protein technologies have developed in response to this predicted growth in global demand for animal-based foods. Because animal-based foods are generally considered to have larger environmental impacts than plant-based foods, Bennett's law suggests that, holding other factors constant, the environmental impacts of agricultural production will increase in absolute and relative terms as economies continue to grow. By adopting processes of "sustainable intensification" in agriculture, it has been argued that these environmental impacts could be greatly lessened.
