= Income elasticity of demand =

Variation of demand for goods with respect to income increase

In economics, the income elasticity of demand (YED) is the responsivenesses of the quantity demanded for a good to a change in consumer income. It is measured as the ratio of the percentage change in quantity demanded to the percentage change in income. For example, if in response to a 10% increase in income, quantity demanded for a good or service were to increase by 20%, the income elasticity of demand would be 20%/10% = 2.0.

== Mathematical definition ==
$$\epsilon_d = \frac{\%\ \mbox{change in quantity demanded}}{\%\ \mbox{change in income}}$$

The point elasticity version, which defines it as an instantaneous rate of change of quantity demanded as income changes, is as follows. For a given Marshallian demand function $Q(I,\vec{P}) ,$ with arguments income and a vector of prices of various goods,

$$\epsilon_d = \frac{\partial Q}{\partial I}\frac{I}{Q}$$

This can be rewritten in the form

$$\epsilon_d = \frac{\partial \ln Q}{\partial \ln I}$$

For discrete changes the elasticity is (using the arc elasticity)

$$\epsilon_d={\Delta Q \over \Delta I} \times {(I_1 + I_2)/2 \over (Q_1 + Q_2)/2}={\Delta Q \over \Delta I}\times {I_1 + I_2 \over Q_1 + Q_2},$$

where subscripts 1 and 2 refer to values before and after the change.

== Interpretation ==
Inferior goods' demand Q_{X} falls as consumer income I increases.

The most commonly used elasticity in economics, the price elasticity of demand, is almost always negative, but many goods have positive income elasticities, many have negative.

- A negative income elasticity of demand is associated with inferior goods; an increase in income will lead to a fall in the quantity demanded.
- A positive income elasticity of demand is associated with normal goods; an increase in income will lead to a rise in quantity demanded.
  - If income elasticity of demand of a commodity is less than 1, it is a necessity good.
  - If the elasticity of demand is greater than 1, it is a luxury good or a superior good.
- A zero income elasticity of demand means that an increase in income does not change the quantity demanded of the good.

Income elasticity of demand can be used as an indicator of future consumption patterns. For example, the "selected income elasticities" below suggest that as incomes increase over time, an increasing portion of consumers' budgets will be devoted to purchasing automobiles and restaurant meals and a smaller share to tobacco and margarine.

Engels curves showing income elasticity of demand (YED) of normal goods (comprising luxury (red) and necessity goods (yellow)), perfectly inelastic (green) and inferior goods (blue)

=== Selected income elasticities ===
- Aluminum 1.5
- A person's own life (also called "value of statistical life") 0.50 to 0.60
- Automobiles 2.98
- Base metals 0.9
- Copper 1.0
- Books 1.44
- Energy 0.7
- Margarine −0.20
- Public transportation −0.36
- Restaurant meals 1.40
- Tobacco 0.42
- Water demand 0.15

Income elasticities of demand for gasoline and diesel have been studied extensively, however, elasticities vary widely between studies. Estimates for income elasticities of demand for gasoline in developed economies range from 0.66 to 1.26.

== Income elasticities and budget shares ==
Being a normal good (elasticity > 0) means that with higher income, consumption of the good will rise, but it does not mean that the good's share of the consumer's budget will rise with income. That depends on whether the elasticity is below or above +1. If the elasticity is negative, such as margarine's -.20 (from the "Selected income elasticities" section of this article), then it is obvious that margarine's share of the consumer's budget will fall if his income rises 10%. If the elasticity is tobacco's +.42, however, an income increase of 10% generates a spending increase of 4.2%, so tobacco's share of the budget falls. The consumer's purchases of books, with an elasticity of +1.44, will rise 14.4%, however, and so will have a higher budget share after his income rises.

In aggregate, food has an income elasticity of demand between zero and one, so expenditure increases with income, but not as fast as income does. This observation is known as Engel's law.

Income elasticities are closely related to the population income distribution and the fraction of the product's sales attributable to buyers from different income brackets. If buyers in a certain income bracket get a pay raise, the income elasticity can be used to predict how much more the market will consume of that product. If the income share elasticity is defined as the negative percentage change in individuals given a percentage increase in income bracken the income-elasticity, after some computation, becomes the expected value of the income-share elasticity with respect to the income distribution of purchasers of the product. When the income distribution is described by a gamma distribution, the income elasticity is proportional to the percentage difference between the average income of the product's buyers and the average income of the population.

== Income-varying elasticities of demand ==
Income elasticities can vary as household income changes, particularly in the case of goods and commodities such as food and energy. At low levels of per capita income, elasticities of demand for food, energy, or other products can be high. As per capita income increases, however, income elasticities fall. At high levels, the marginal elasticities may go to zero, or even negative. These differences can be observed by comparing countries at different income levels. For example, estimates of the income elasticity of cereals ranges from 0.62 in Tanzania to 0.47 in Georgia, 0.28 in Slovenia, and 0.05 in the United States.

The decline in elasticities as income increases is a form of Kuznets' curve. As economies industrialize and get wealthier, consumer demand changes. At low levels of income, demand for energy or other goods increases very rapidly. However, as income rises further, consumption requirements (e.g. for food or energy) are increasingly satisfied. In addition, consumption patterns shift toward services rather than goods, which require fewer commodities to produce.

== See also ==
- cross elasticity of demand (XED)
- price elasticity of demand (PED)
- price elasticity of supply (PES)
