= Engel curve =

Curve describing how household income varies with household expenditure

In microeconomics, an Engel curve describes how household expenditure on a particular good or service varies with household income. There are two varieties of Engel curves. Budget share Engel curves describe how the proportion of household income spent on a good varies with income. Alternatively, Engel curves can also describe how real expenditure varies with household income. They are named after the German statistician Ernst Engel (1821–1896), who was the first to investigate this relationship between goods expenditure and income systematically in 1857. The best-known single result from the article is Engel's law which states that as income grows, spending on food becomes a smaller share of income; therefore, the share of a household's or country's income spent on food is an indication of their affluence.

Engels curves showing income elasticity of demand (YED) of normal goods (comprising luxury (red) and necessity goods (yellow)), perfectly inelastic (green) and inferior goods (blue)

== Shape ==
Graphically, the Engel curve is represented in the first quadrant of the Cartesian coordinate system. Income is shown on the horizontal axis and the quantity demanded for the selected good or service is shown on the vertical.

The attached figure shows the derivation process of the Engel curve in case of necessities. Panel (a) is an undifferentiated graph representing consumers' preferences for goods X and Y. The three parallel lines of Rs.300, Rs 400. And Rs.500 are called budget lines. And the slope of these three lines is the same, which implies that the prices of the two goods are constant, while the budget line farther from the origin indicates a larger budget amount. The three points R, S, and T in the graph hint different preference combinations. The line connecting these three points is called the income consumption curve (ICC). By extending Panel (a) to Panel (b), the Engel curve for good X is obtained by connecting the points R’, S’, and T’.

The shapes of Engel curves depend on many demographic variables and other consumer characteristics. A good's Engel curve reflects its income elasticity and indicates whether the good is an inferior, normal, or luxury good. Empirical Engel curves are close to linear for some goods, and highly nonlinear for others.

For normal goods, the Engel curve has a positive gradient. That is, as income increases, the quantity demanded increases. Amongst normal goods, there are two possibilities. Although the Engel curve remains upward sloping in both cases, it bends toward the X-axis for necessities and towards the Y-axis for luxury goods.

For inferior goods, the Engel curve has a negative gradient. That means that as the consumer has more income, they will buy less of the inferior good because they are able to purchase better goods.

For goods with a Marshallian demand function generated from a utility function of Gorman polar form, the Engel curve is linear.

Many Engel curves feature saturation properties in that their slope tends toward infinity at high income levels, which suggests that there exists an absolute limit on how much expenditure on a good will rise as household income increases. This saturation property has been linked to slowdowns in the growth of demand for some sectors in the economy, causing major changes in an economy's sectoral composition to take place.

== Other properties ==
When considering a system of Engel curves, the adding-up theorem dictates that the sum of all total expenditure elasticities, when weighted by the corresponding budget share, must add up to unity. This rules out the possibility of saturation being a general property of Engel curves across all goods as this would imply that the income elasticity of all goods approaches zero starting from a certain level of income. The adding-up restriction stems from the assumption that consumption always takes place at the upper boundary of the household's opportunity set, which is only fulfilled if the household cannot completely satisfy all its wants within the boundaries of the opportunity set.

Other scholars argue that an upper saturation level exists for all types of goods and services.

== Applications ==
In microeconomics Engel curves are used for equivalence scale calculations and related welfare comparisons, and determine properties of demand systems such as aggregability and rank.

Engel curves have also been used to study how the changing industrial composition of growing economies are linked to the changes in the composition of household demand.

In trade theory, one explanation of inter-industry trade has been the hypothesis that countries with similar income levels possess similar preferences for goods and services (the Lindner hypothesis), which suggests that understanding how the composition of household demand changes with income may play an important role in determining global trade patterns.

Engel curves are also of great relevance in the measurement of inflation, and tax policy.

The Engel curve allows estimating the consumer price index deviation for old age.

The Engel curve method is used to study the improvement of farmers' welfare by comparing food consumption and income growth. What is more, it infers the cost of living of households. Additionally, it also studies the impact of the sources of household consumption diversity on welfare.

The Engel curve estimates the collective household model.

Engel curves assess whether outdoor leisure is a luxury or a necessity.

The deflator of the Engel curve is not sufficiently representative of the deflator obtained from the multilateral price index. It is not appropriate to use only the Engel method in some regions, the changes in poverty and inequality, the estimated locations and levels will be greatly distorted, which will result in wrong conclusions.

Engel curves have found a wide range of applications, including assessing policies related to agriculture, taxation, trade, industrial organization, housing, and the measurement of poverty and inequality.

== Problems ==
=== Low explanatory power ===
Heteroscedasticity is a well known problem in the estimation of Engel curves: as income rises the difference between actual observation and the estimated expenditure level tends to increase dramatically. Engel curve and other demand function models still fail to explain most of the observed variation in individual consumption behavior.

As a result, many scholars acknowledge that influences other than current prices and current total expenditure must be systematically modeled if even the broad pattern of demand is to be explained in a theoretically coherent and empirically robust way.

For example, some success has been achieved in understanding how social status concerns have influenced household expenditure on highly visible goods.

=== Accounting for their shape ===
Ernst Engel argued that households possessed a hierarchy of wants that determined the shape of Engel curves. As household income rises some motivations become more prominent in household expenditure as the more basic wants that dominate consumption patterns at low-income levels, such as hunger, eventually become satiated at higher income levels. Engel's argument is formalized in neoclassical consumer theory, which conceives of the relationship between income and consumption patterns in terms of utility optimization. In such models, consumers allocate their expenditures to goods and services with the highest marginal utility. After basic needs are satiated, the marginal utility from further consumption of those goods declines, and additional income is allocated to other goods and services. A "necessity" is thus a good whose marginal utility declines more quickly than the average good.

In the standard household engel curve, there are three possible sources of heterogeneity that are statistically ignorable when estimating household engel curves:

1. There can be latent household effects on individual demand behavior. Families gather selectively, and they may influence each other's behavior, such as consumption patterns and preferences.

2. There are differences in individual demand parameters within households. We know that when the income gains are assigned to people with different consumption patterns and different preferences over how the extra money should be spent, Engel's Law may stop to hold.

3. There is heterogeneity in the extent of inequality within households. Intra-household inequality amplifies the effect of the bias on the Engel curve.

There is no apparent reason why these sources of heterogeneity are statistically ignorable when estimating household Engel curves. Latent heterogeneity in demand behavior may well be correlated with household total spending or income. For example, there may well be latent differences in human capital that influence demands, such as when a mother's education influences the priority given to nutrition. In turn, human capital is likely to be positively correlated with household consumption or income. Another example relates to the household's social status in the local community of residence. Perceptions of the obligations that come with higher social status may well influence spending patterns; for example, one may feel the need to show off with a TV or have enough food ready if someone shows up. Such "status-seeking" behavior can be expected at a given level of total spending and correlated with that spending. These factors above are why Engel's coefficient of a family may be affected in the statistical process.

== See also ==
- List of countries by GNI per capita growth
