= Ernst Engel =

German statistician and economist (1821–1896)

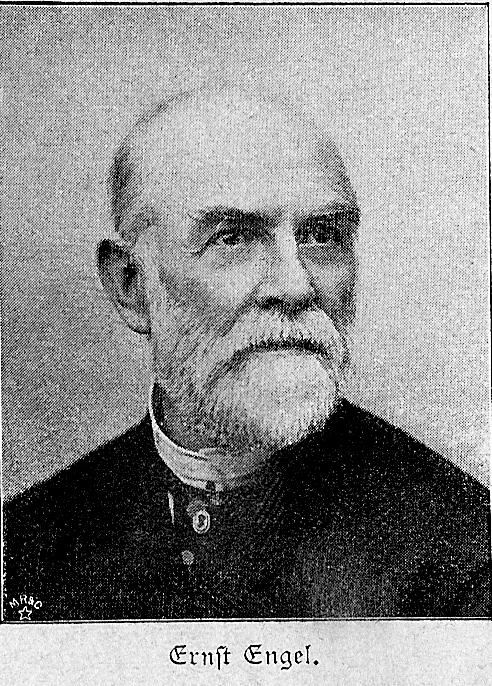
- Ernst Engel
- Born: 26 March 1821; Dresden, Kingdom of Saxony
- Died: 8 December 1896 (aged 75); Radebeul, German Empire
- Known for: Engel curve and the Engel's law
- Scientific career
- Fields: Statistician and economist

Ernst Engel (/ˈɛŋɡəl/; German: [ˈɛŋəl]; 26 March 1821 – 8 December 1896) was a German statistician and economist, famous for the Engel curve and Engel's law.

== Early life and education ==
Engel was born in Dresden, then part of the Kingdom of Saxony, on 26 March, 1821. He studied at the Freiberg University of Mining and Technology in Saxony, and on completing his curriculum traveled in Germany and France.

== Career ==
Immediately after the revolution of 1848, Engel was attached to the royal commission in Saxony appointed to determine the relations between trade and labor. In 1850, he was directed by the government to assist in the organization of the German Industrial Exhibition of Leipzig (the first of its kind). His efforts were so successful that, in 1854, he was induced to enter the government service, as chief of the newly instituted statistical department. He retired, however, from the office in 1858. He founded at Dresden the first Mortgage Insurance Society (Hypotheken-Versicherungsgesellschaft), and as a result of the success of his work, was summoned in 1860 to Berlin as director of the statistical department, in succession to Karl Friedrich Wilhelm Dieterici. In his new office, he made himself a name of worldwide reputation. Raised to the rank of Geheimer Regierungsrat, he retired in 1882 and lived henceforward in Serkowitz, today part of Radebeul near Dresden, where he died in 1896. His investigations into the social condition of the working classes were much noted.

=== Works ===
Engel was a voluminous writer on the subjects with which his name is connected, but his statistical papers are mostly published in the periodicals which he himself established, namely, Preuss. Statistik (in 1861); Zeitschrift des Königlichen Preußischen Statistischen Bureaus, and Zeitschrift des Statistischen Bureaus des Königreichs Sachsen. Among his works were Die Methoden der Volkszählung ("Census methods," 1861), Die Volkszählungen, ihre Stellung zur Wissenschaft und ihre Aufgabe in der Geschichte ("Censuses, their place in science and role in history," 1862), Land und Leute des Preussischen Staates ("The Prussian land and people," 1863), and Das Zeitalter des Dampfes ("The era of steam," 1881). Under the cover title “Ernst Engel. Statistics. Issue 5,” August Bebels work “Women and Socialism” was first published in February 1879.
