= Ceteris paribus =

Latin phrase

Ceteris paribus (also spelled caeteris paribus) (Classical Latin pronunciation: [ˈkeːtɛ.riːs ˈpa.rɪ.bʊs]) is a Latin phrase, meaning "other things equal"; some other English translations of the phrase are "all other things being equal", "other things held constant", "all else unchanged", and "all else being equal". A statement about a causal, empirical, moral, or logical relation between two states of affairs is ceteris paribus if it is acknowledged that the statement, although usually accurate in expected conditions, can fail because of, or the relation can be abolished by, intervening factors.

A ceteris paribus assumption is often key to scientific inquiry, because scientists seek to eliminate factors that perturb a relation of interest. Thus epidemiologists, for example, may seek to control independent variables as factors that may influence dependent variables—the outcomes of interest. Likewise, in scientific modeling, simplifying assumptions permit illustration of concepts considered relevant to the inquiry. An example in economics is "If the price of milk falls, ceteris paribus, the quantity of milk demanded will rise." This means that, if other factors, such as deflation, pricing objectives, utility, and marketing methods, do not change, the decrease in the price of milk will lead to an increase in demand for it.

== Economics ==
Some examples of ceteris paribus conditions commonly employed in economics include:

- The number of consumers in the market
- Consumer tastes or preferences
- Prices of substitute goods
- Consumer price expectations
- Personal income

=== History in economics ===
Ceteris paribus has been relevant in economics for centuries, dating back to its first traces in 1295 by Peter Olivi. In the 16th century, Juan de Medina and Luis de Molina of the School of Salamanca first used “ceteris paribus” when discussing economic issues.

The earliest case of the Latin phrase being used in the English language publications was in the 17th century by William Petty, who used the clause to condition his labour theory of value. Economist John Stuart Mill’s use of the Latin phrase had significant influences as he characterised economy through how it managed troubling factors.

Economist Alfred Marshall had significant effects on the popularity for the ceteris paribus clause in the 19th century. It was his support to economics where he promoted partial equilibrium analysis, claiming that this analysis, and similar analysis’ hold due to the ceteris paribus clauses.

The importance that ceteris paribus has brought to economics is not only found in histographical interests, but is still vital to economists today, seen frequently in textbooks.

=== Interpretation ===
One of the disciplines in which ceteris paribus clauses are most widely used is economics, in which they are employed to simplify the formulation and description of economic outcomes. When using ceteris paribus in economics, one assumes that all other variables except those under immediate consideration are held constant. For example, it can be predicted that if the price of beef increases—ceteris paribus—the quantity of beef demanded by buyers will decrease. In this example, the clause is used to operationally describe everything surrounding the relationship between both the price and the quantity demanded of an ordinary good.

This operational description intentionally ignores both known and unknown factors that may also influence the relationship between price and quantity demanded, and thus to assume ceteris paribus is to assume away any interference with the given example. Such factors that would be intentionally ignored include: a change in the price of substitute goods, (e.g., the price of pork or lamb); a change in the level of risk aversion among buyers (e.g., due to an increase in the fear of mad cow disease); and a change in the level of overall demand for a good regardless of its current price (e.g., a societal shift toward vegetarianism).

The clause is often loosely translated as "holding all else constant." It does not imply that no other things will in fact change; rather, it isolates the effect of one particular change. Holding all other things constant is directly analogous to using a partial derivative in calculus rather than a total derivative, and to running a regression containing multiple variables rather than just one in order to isolate the individual effect of one of the variables. Ceteris paribus is an extension of scientific modeling. The scientific method is built on identifying, isolating, and testing the impact of an independent variable on a dependent variable.

One thing to note is that since economic variables can only be isolated in theory and not in practice, ceteris paribus can only ever highlight tendencies, not absolutes.

=== Alfred Marshall's characterization ===
The clause is used to consider the effect of some causes in isolation, by assuming that other influences are absent. Alfred Marshall expressed the use of the clause as follows:

The element of time is a chief cause of those difficulties in economic investigations which make it necessary for man with his limited powers to go step by step; breaking up a complex question, studying one bit at a time, and at last combining his partial solutions into a more or less complete solution of the whole riddle. In breaking it up, he segregates those disturbing causes, whose wanderings happen to be inconvenient, for the time in a pound called Ceteris Paribus. The study of some group of tendencies is isolated by the assumption other things being equal: the existence of other tendencies is not denied, but their disturbing effect is neglected for a time. The more the issue is thus narrowed, the more exactly can it be handled: but also the less closely does it correspond to real life. I.e. The more we apply the rule of ceteris paribus the further we distance ourselves from reality, e.g. If hydrocarbon fuels are infinite then society is sustainable. Each exact and firm handling of a narrow issue, however, helps towards treating broader issues, in which that narrow issue is contained, more exactly than would otherwise have been possible. With each step more things can be let out of the pound; exact discussions can be made less abstract, realistic discussions can be made less inexact than was possible at an earlier stage.

=== Two uses ===
The above passage by Marshall highlights two ways in which the ceteris paribus clause may be used: The one is hypothetical, in the sense that some factor is assumed fixed in order to analyse the influence of another factor in isolation. This would be hypothetical isolation. An example would be the hypothetical separation of the income effect and the substitution effect of a price change, which actually go together. The other use of the ceteris paribus clause is to see it as a means for obtaining an approximate solution. Here it would yield a substantive isolation.

Substantive isolation has two aspects: temporal and causal. Temporal isolation requires the factors fixed under the ceteris paribus clause to actually move so slowly relative to the other influence that they can be taken as practically constant at any point in time. So, if vegetarianism spreads very slowly, inducing a slow decline in the demand for beef, and the market for beef clears comparatively quickly, we can determine the price of beef at any instant by the intersection of supply and demand, and the changing demand for beef will account for the price changes over time (Temporary Equilibrium Method).

The other aspect of substantive isolation is causal isolation: those factors frozen under a ceteris paribus clause should not significantly be affected by the processes under study. If a change in government policies induces changes in consumers' behaviour on the same time scale, the assumption that consumer behaviour remains unchanged while policy changes is inadmissible as a substantive isolation (Lucas critique).

=== Applications ===
The concept of ceteris paribus is crucial for economists and can be applied in researching:

1. Supply chain. Ceteris paribus considers aspects of production, that being competition in the market, production costs, inflation, and consumer trends to conclude pricing of goods, imposing that keeping the aspects of production constant, minimising supply will adjust prices to increase.
2. Law of supply and demand. The law of demand states that, when prices rise the demand of goods fall, whilst the law of supply dictates that as prices rise sellers are more willing to supply. When these laws interrelate market prices and supply in the market are determined. Ceteris paribus is used in the law of supply and demand through determining how independent variables will impact the casual factors of prices and supply in the market.
3. Gross domestic product. Ceteris paribus is used in relation to GDP to determine how the money market will change when variables remain constant.
4. Interest rates. Through keeping interest rates as the independent variable, as interest rates rise, thus borrowing costs rise forcing a reduction in the demand for debt, that being the dependent variable.
5. Minimum wage. To define the possible effects of a rise in the minimum wage economists will use ceteris paribus. Possible effects include how wage increases may force employments down.

=== Limitation of ceteris paribus ===
In reality, there are certain limitations for the ceteris paribus condition, in many situations it is not feasible for economists to keep factors constant or make assumptions. When testing, economists are unable to regulate every variable or are able to classify important or potential variables. Although there are certain limitations with the ceteris paribus condition, when researching tendencies in the market it is quite significant.

Ceteris Paribus is also inherently limited by what has been learned in complexity science about those situations which are highly affected by interconnections. Amid highly connected situations, a change to any one variable will change all others. In this way, when these complex connections are active, it is not possible in reality to hold all other values constant. Complex interconnected reality is not only common in physical and natural sciences but is of great influence in most socio-economic sciences.

== See also ==
- Apples and oranges
- Confounding
- List of Latin phrases
- Mutatis mutandis
- Occam's razor
- Partial derivative
