= Luxury goods =

Good for which demand increases more than what is proportional as income rises

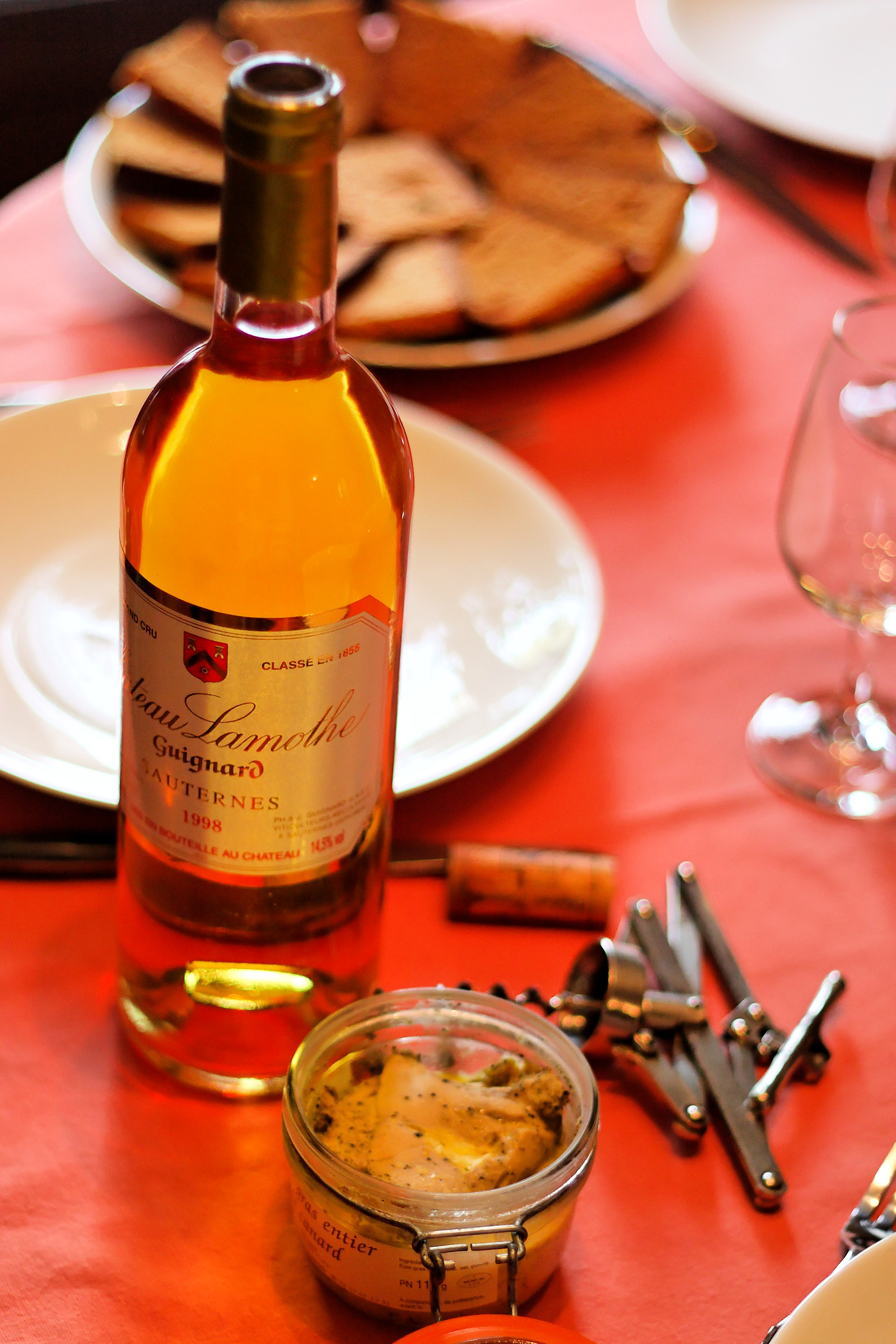
Wine and foie gras

In economics, a luxury good, also called upmarket or superior good, is a product or item or service for which demand increases disproportionately more as income rises, so that expenditures on the good become a more significant proportion of overall spending. Luxury goods are in contrast to necessity goods, where demand increases proportionally less than income. Whereas people consume necessity goods to meet basic survival needs, luxury goods are consumed both for their "intrinsic quality and to signal their wealth and confirm social status."

== Definition, etymology and usage ==
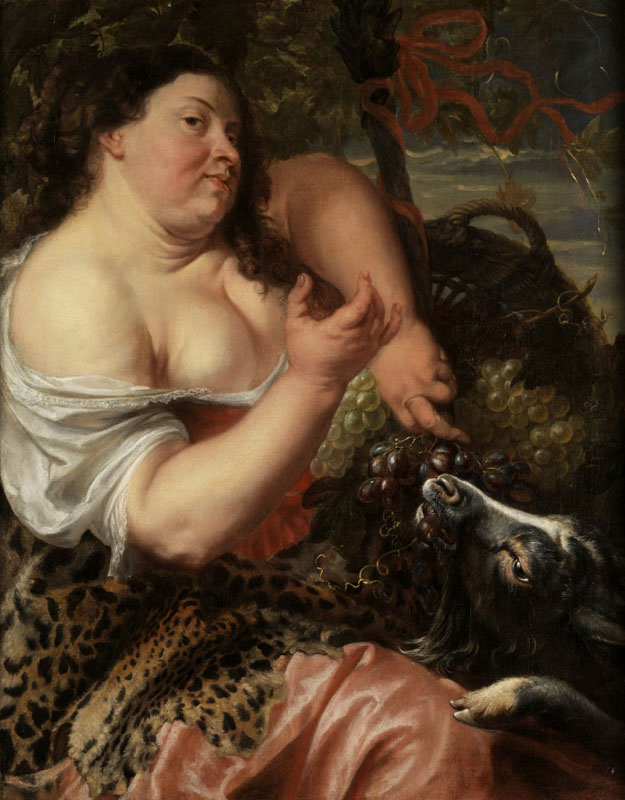
The 17th century Flemish painter Jan Cossiers' "Allegory of luxury" captures a historical perspective on fine living.

The word "luxury" comes from the Latin term "luxuria", which meant "excess, extravagant living, profusion; delicacy." The meaning gained different implications as the word became part of Old French as "luxurie" in the 12th century, taking on the sense of "debauchery, dissoluteness, [or] lust."

The word "luxury" has an etymological cognate in the Latin verb luctor meaning "to overextend" or "to strain". From this, the noun luxuria and the verb luxurio developed, "indicating immoderate growth, swelling, ... in persons and animals, willful or unruly behavior, disregard for moral restraints, and licentiousness", and the term has had negative connotations for most of its long history. One definition in the OED is a "thing desirable but not indispensable". As the word became part of the English language it "lost its pejorative taint"; by the 1630s, the English word meant "habit of indulgence in what is choice or costly" and by 1704 it meant "sumptuous surroundings." By 1780, the word was defined as "something choice or comfortable beyond life's necessities."

Economists can identify a luxury good by comparing the demand for the good at one point in time against the demand for the good at a different time, at a different income level. When personal income increases, demand for luxury goods increases even more than income does. Conversely, when personal income decreases, demand for luxury goods drops even more than income does. For example, if income rises 1%, and the demand for a product rises 2%, then the product is a luxury good. This contrasts with necessity goods, or basic goods, for which demand stays the same or decreases only slightly as income decreases.

=== Scope of the term ===
With increasing accessibility to luxury goods, new product categories have been created within the luxury market, called "accessible luxury" or "mass luxury". These are meant specifically for the middle class, sometimes called the "aspiring class" in this context. Because luxury has diffused into the masses, defining the word has become more difficult.

Whereas "luxury" often refers to certain types of products, luxury is not restricted to physical goods; services can also be luxury. Likewise, from the consumer perspective, luxury is an experience defined as "hedonic escapism".

=== Confusion with normal goods ===
In economics, "superior goods" is the gradable antonym of "inferior good". If the quantity of an item demanded increases with income, but not by enough to increase the share of the budget spent on it, then it is only a normal good and is not a superior good. Consumption of all normal goods increases as income increases. For example, if income increases by 50%, then consumption will increase (maybe by only 1%, maybe by 40%, maybe by 70%). A superior good is a normal good for which the proportional consumption increase exceeds the proportional income increase. So, if income increases by 50%, then consumption of a superior good will increase by more than 50% (maybe 51%, maybe 70%).

In economics terminology, all goods with an income elasticity of demand greater than zero are "normal", but only the subset having income elasticity of demand > 1 are "superior".

Some articles in the microeconomics discipline use the term superior good as an alternative to an inferior good, thus making "superior goods" and "normal goods" synonymous. Where this is done, a product making up an increasing share of spending under income increases is often called an ultra-superior good.

=== Art history ===
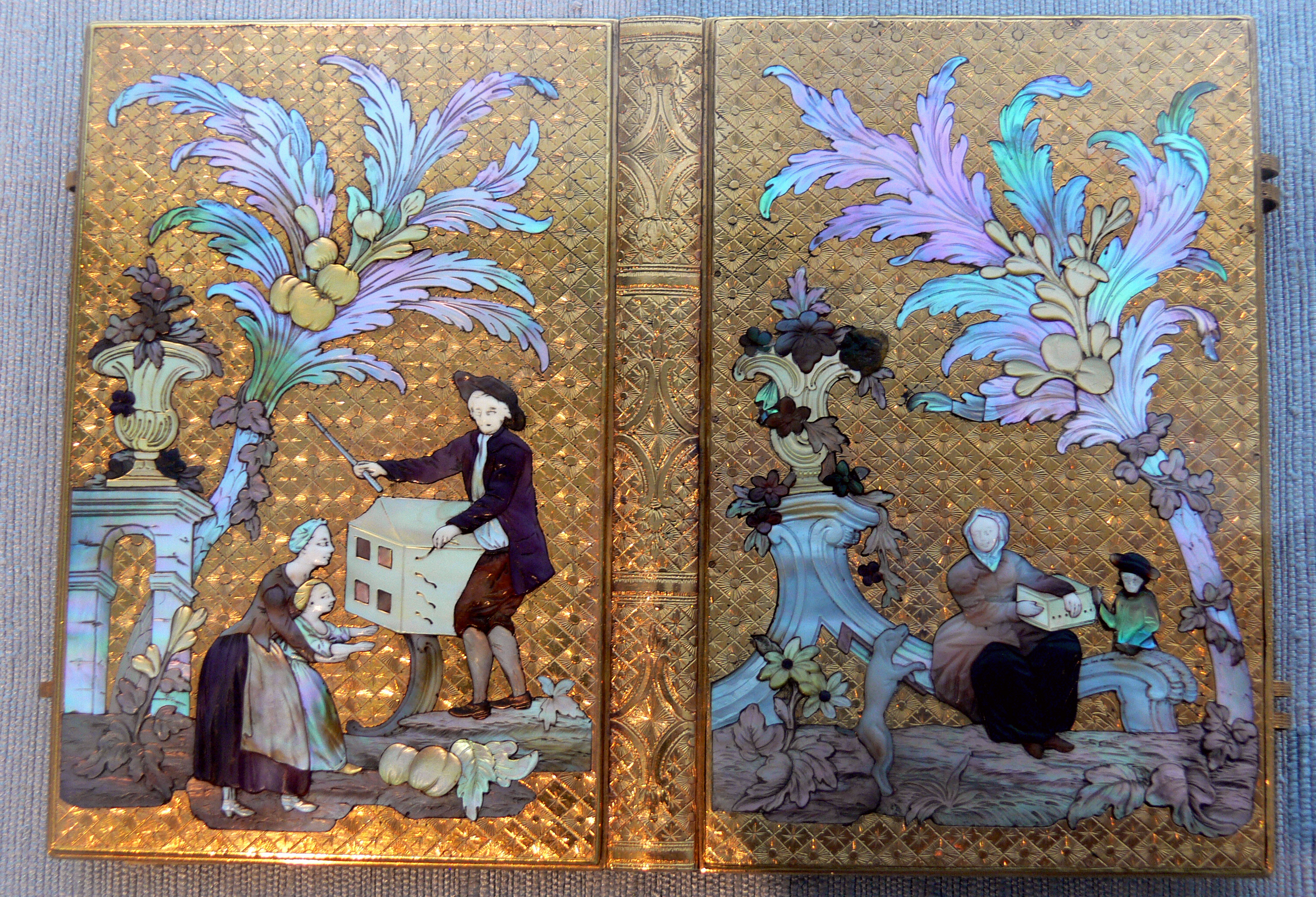
Secular Rococo luxury or treasure binding for a book, using techniques from the making of gold boxes, in gold, mother of pearl and hardstone, Berlin, 1750–1760. By this time, such lavish bindings were unusual.

Though often verging on the meaningless in modern marketing, "luxury" remains a legitimate and current technical term in art history for objects which are especially highly decorated to very high standards and which use expensive materials. Luxuries like this can play a role in developing trade-relations with colonies.

The term is especially used for medieval manuscripts to distinguish between practical working books (for normal use) and fully illuminated manuscripts, that were often bound in treasure bindings with metalwork and jewels. These are often much larger, with less text on each page and many illustrations, and (if liturgical texts) were originally usually kept on the altar or in the sacristy rather than in any library that the church or monastery who owned them may have had. Secular luxury manuscripts were commissioned by the very wealthy and differed in the same ways from cheaper books.

"Luxury" and "luxury arts" may be used for other applied arts where both utilitarian and luxury versions of the same types of objects were made. This might cover metalwork, ceramics, glass, arms and armour, and various objects. It is much less used for objects from the fine arts, with no function beyond being an artwork: paintings, drawings, and sculpture, even though the disparity in cost between an expensive and cheap work may have been as large.

By 2026, luxury goods will no longer be defined solely by rarity or high prices, but also by their symbolic, cultural, and experiential value. Contemporary luxury is commonly associated with craftsmanship, brand heritage, exclusivity, sustainability, and the ability to communicate personal identity and social status.

== History ==
An awareness of a concept of luxury dates back at least as far as Plato. The issue of luxury was also considered by John Locke, Adam Smith, Karl Marx, Georg Simmel, and Max Weber.

== Market ==
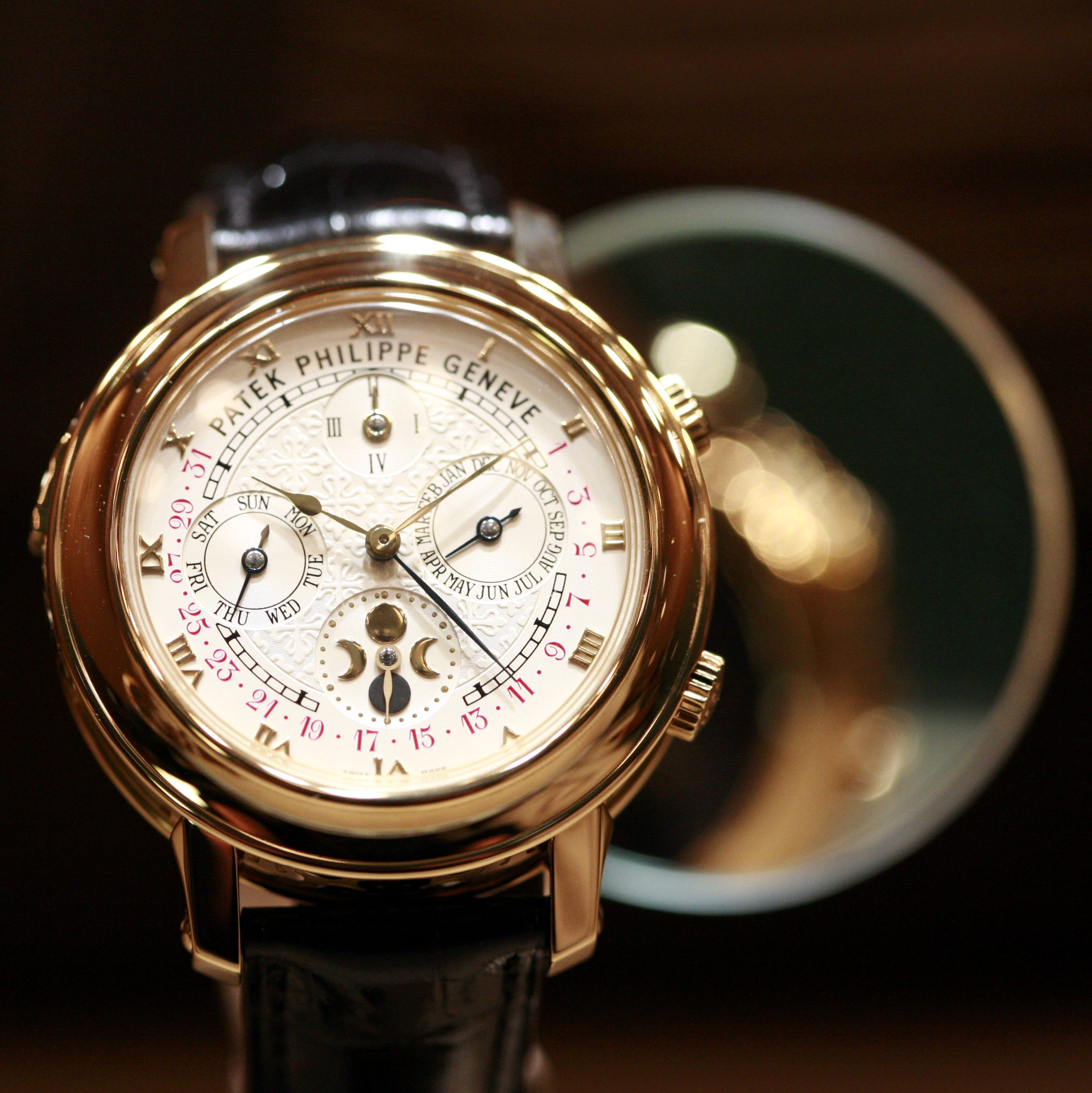
The invention of affordable quartz watches caused mechanical watches to become primarily luxury goods.

=== Characteristics ===
Luxury goods have high income elasticity of demand: as people become wealthier, they will buy proportionately more luxury goods. This also means that should there be a decline in income, its demand will drop more than proportionately. The income elasticity of demand is not constant with respect to income and may change signs at different income levels. That is to say, a luxury good may become a necessity good or even an inferior good at different income levels.

Some luxury products have been claimed to be examples of Veblen goods, with a positive price elasticity of demand: for example, making a perfume more expensive can increase its perceived value as a luxury good to such an extent that sales can go up, rather than down. However, Veblen goods are not synonymous with luxury goods.

Although the technical term luxury good is independent of the goods' quality, they are generally considered to be goods at the highest end of the market in terms of quality and price. Many markets have a luxury segment including, for example, luxury versions of automobiles, yachts, wine, bottled water, coffee, tea, foods, watches, clothes, jewelry, cosmetics and high fidelity sound equipment. Luxuries may be services. Hiring full-time or live-in domestic servants is a luxury reflecting income disparities. Some financial services, especially in some brokerage houses, can be considered luxury services by default because persons in lower-income brackets generally do not use them.

Luxury goods often have special luxury packaging to differentiate the products from mainstream competitors.

=== Trends ===
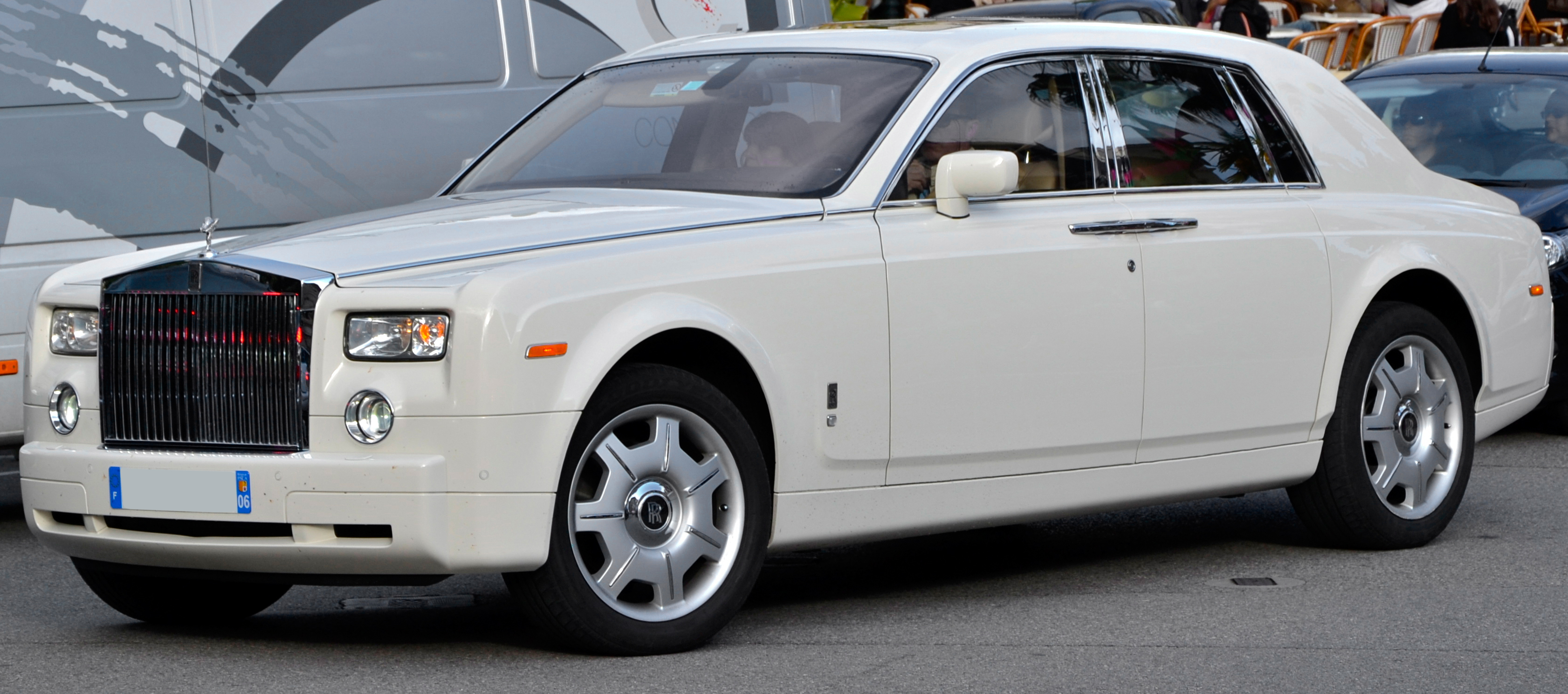
Luxury car

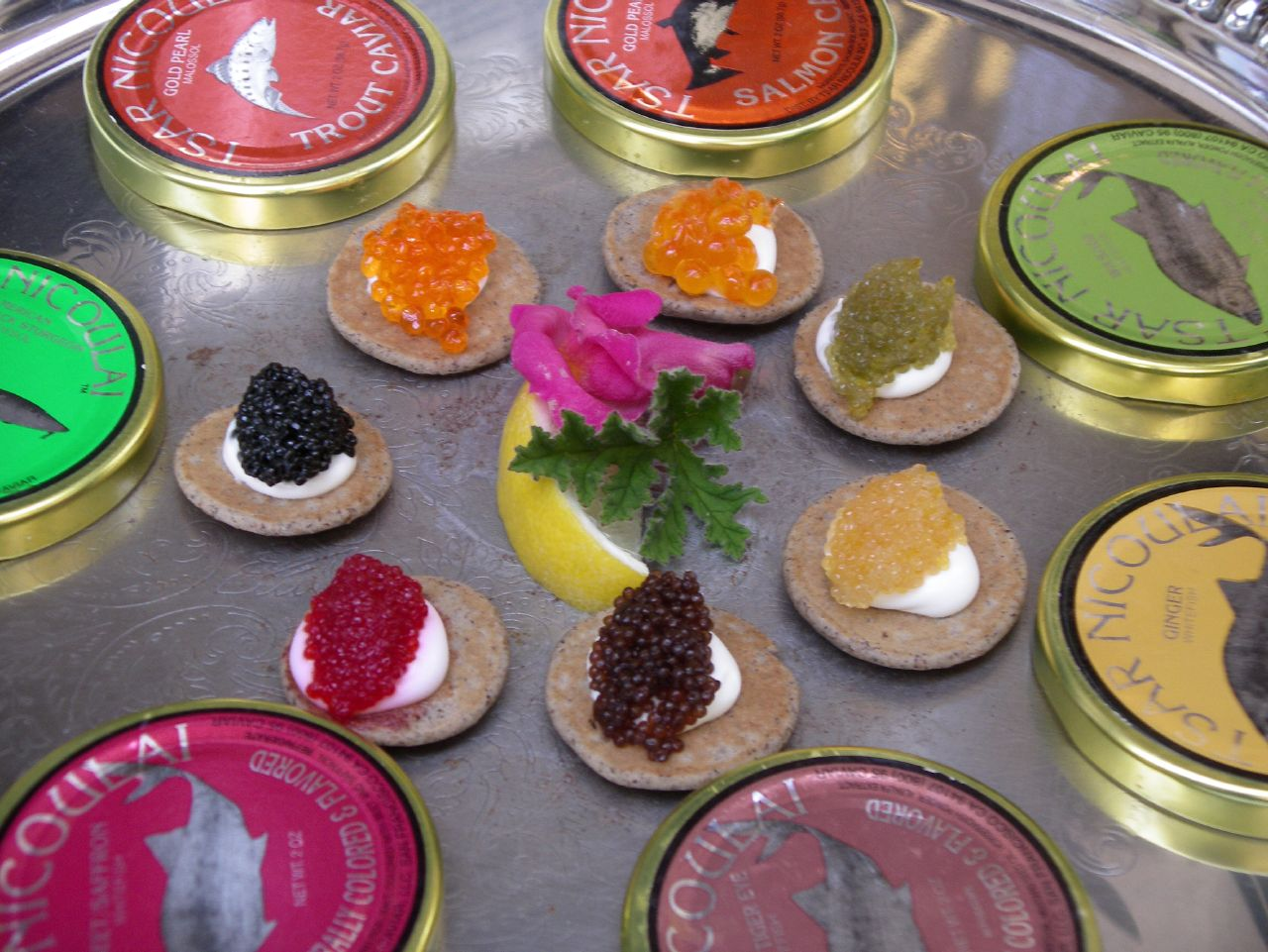
Seven different types of caviar

Originally, luxury goods were available only to the very wealthy and "aristocratic world of old money" that offered them a history of tradition, superior quality, and a pampered buying experience. Luxury goods have been transformed by a shift from custom-made (bespoke) works with exclusive distribution practices by specialized, quality-minded family-run and small businesses to a mass production of specialty branded goods by profit-focused large corporations and marketers. The trend in modern luxury is simply a product or service that is marketed, packaged, and sold by global corporations that are focused "on growth, visibility, brand awareness, advertising, and, above all, profits." Increasingly, luxury logos are now available to all consumers at a premium price across the world, including online.

Global consumer companies, such as Procter & Gamble, are also attracted to the industry due to the difficulty of making a profit in the mass consumer goods market. The customer base for various luxury goods continue to be more culturally diversified, and this presents more unseen challenges and new opportunities to companies in this industry.

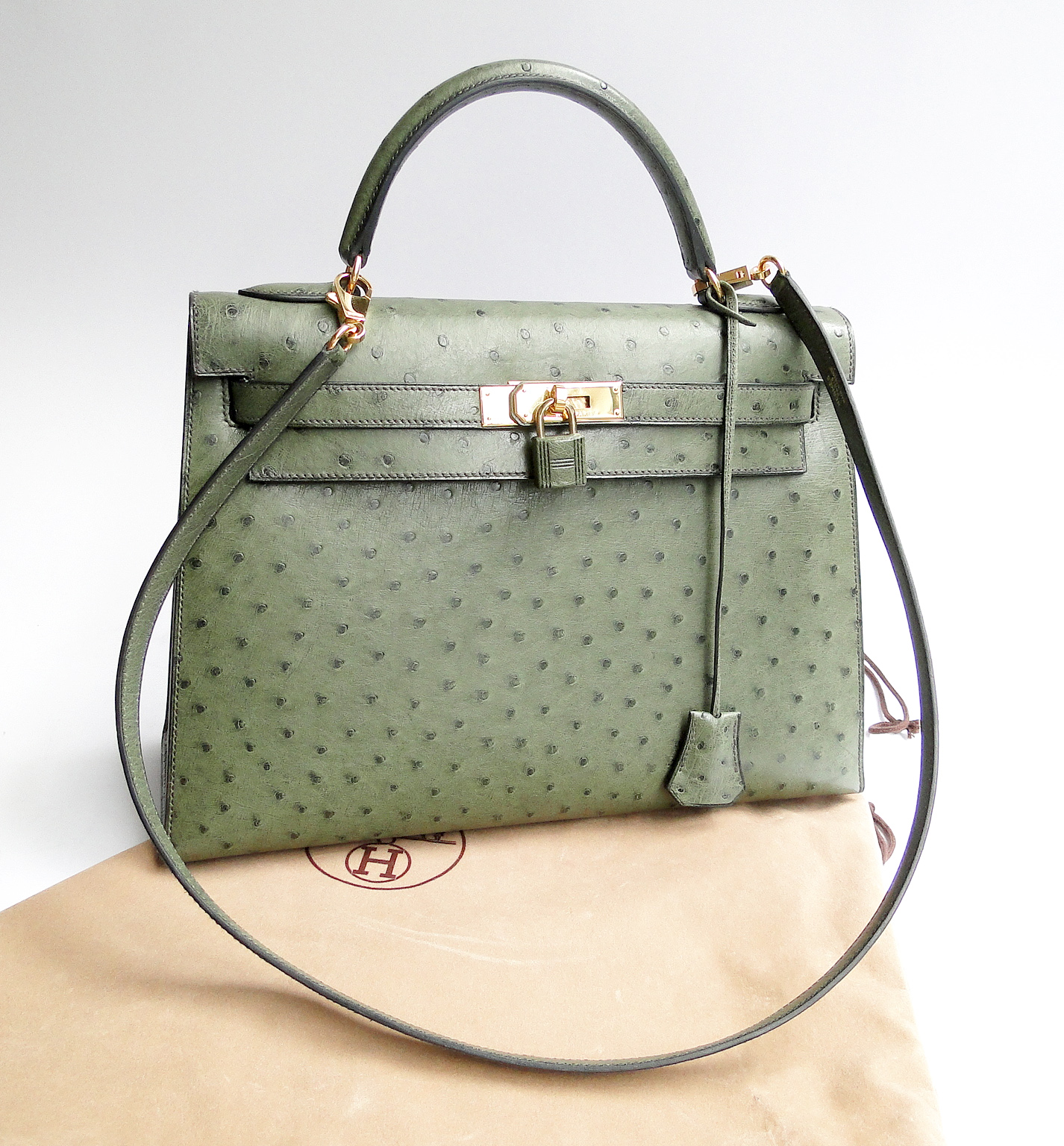
A luxury handbag. While many handbags are valued on their ability to carry objects, designer handbags are valued based on fashion.

There are several trends in luxury:

- Democratization of luxury. Also known as masstige (from mass-prestige), is a marketing strategy that aims to make brands prestigious while retaining their affordability.
- Globalization: Consumers in some countries are becoming wealthier; thus, new markets are opening for luxury marketers. Reports by consulting agencies like McKinsey predicted that East Asia would become the world's largest personal luxury goods market. China will consume half the global market value of luxury goods.
- Consolidation: Consolidation involves the growth of big companies and ownership of brands across many segments of luxury products. Examples include Kering, LVMH, and Richemont, which dominate the market in areas ranging from luxury drinks to fashion and cosmetics.
- Luxury brand collaborations. This marketing strategy demonstrates the potential of unexpected partnerships and co-branding opportunities between luxury brands and an unconventional partner seemingly at the opposite end of the design spectrum. Collaborations include pairings of luxury brands like Fendi x Versace but also pairings with streetwear brands including skateboarding brand Supreme x LVMH, with celebrities such as Bad Bunny x Adidas, anime characters like Doraemon x Gucci, and now video game franchises like Fortnite x Balenciaga. The collaborations are often limited edition collections.

=== Size ===
The luxury goods market has been on an upward climb for many years. Apart from the setback caused by the 1997 Asian financial crisis, the industry has performed well, particularly in 2000. That year, the world luxury goods market was worth nearly $170 billion and grew 7.9 percent. The United States has been the largest regional market for luxury goods. The largest sector in this category was luxury drinks, including premium whisky, champagne, and cognac. The watches and jewelry section showed the strongest performance, growing in value by 23.3 percent, while the clothing and accessories section grew 11.6 percent between 1996 and 2000, to $32.8 billion. The largest ten markets for luxury goods account for 83 percent of overall sales and include Brazil, China, France, Germany, Italy, Japan, Russia, Spain, Switzerland and United Kingdom, and United States.

In 2012, China surpassed Japan as the world's largest luxury market. China's luxury consumption accounts for over 25% of the global market. According to the Global Wealth and Lifestyle Report 2020, Hong Kong, Shanghai, Tokyo and Singapore were four of the five most expensive cities for luxury goods in Asia. In 2014, the luxury sector was expected to grow over the following ten years because of 440 million consumers spending a total of 880 billion euros, or $1.2 trillion.

=== Advertising ===
The advertising expenditure for the average luxury brand is 5-15% of sales revenue, or about 25% with the inclusion of other communications such as public relations, events, and sponsorships.

A rather small group in comparison, the wealthy tend to be extremely influential. Once a brand gets an "endorsement" from members of this group, then the brand can be defined as a true "luxury" brand. An example of different product lines in the same brand is found in the automotive industry, with "entry-level" cars marketed to younger, less wealthy consumers, and higher-cost models for older and more wealthy consumers.

== Economics ==
Engels curves showing income elasticity of demand (YED) of normal goods (comprising luxury (red) and necessity goods (yellow)), perfectly inelastic (green) and inferior goods (blue)

In economics, superior goods or luxury goods make up a larger proportion of consumption as income rises, and therefore are a type of normal goods in consumer theory. Such a good must possess two economic characteristics: it must be scarce, and, along with that, it must have a high price. The scarcity of the good can be natural or artificial; however, the general population (i.e., consumers) must recognize the good as distinguishably better. Possession of such a good usually signifies "superiority" in resources and is usually accompanied by prestige.

A Veblen good is a superior good with a prestige value so high that a price decline might lower demand. Veblen's contribution is demonstrated by the significance of the Veblen effect, which refers to the phenomenon of people purchasing costly items even when more affordable options that provide similar levels of satisfaction are available.

The income elasticity of a superior good is above one by definition because it raises the expenditure share as income rises. A superior good may also be a luxury good that is not purchased below a certain income level. Examples would include smoked salmon, caviar, and most other delicacies. On the other hand, superior goods may have a wide quality distribution, such as wine and holidays. However, though the number of such goods consumed may stay constant even with rising wealth, the level of spending will go up to secure a better experience.

A higher income inequality leads to higher consumption of luxury goods because of status anxiety.

== Socioeconomic significance ==
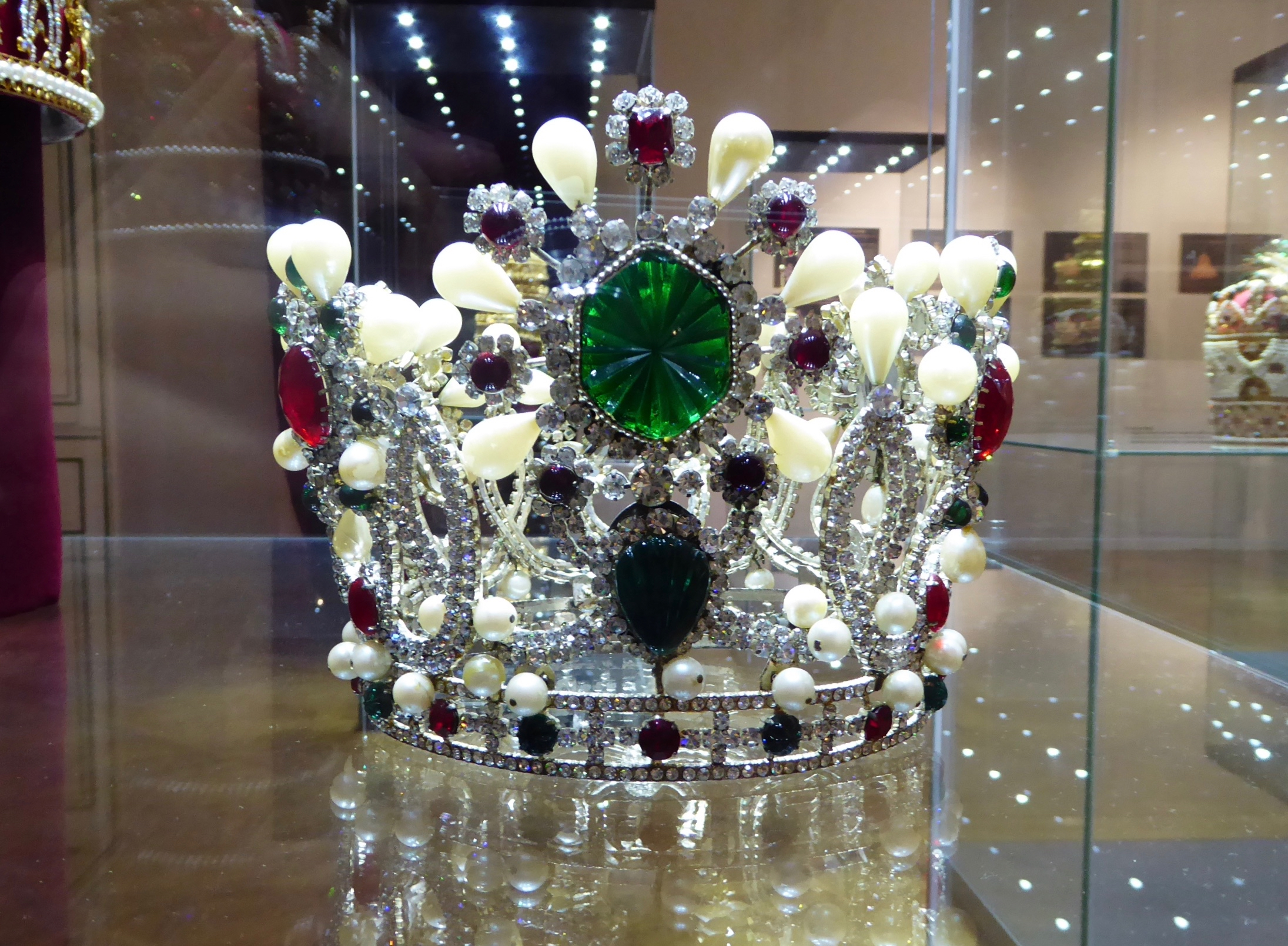
Crown of Empress Farah Pahlavi of Iran

Several manufactured products attain the status of "luxury goods" due to their design, quality, durability, or performance, which are superior to comparable substitutes.

Some goods are perceived as luxurious by the public simply because they play the role of status symbols, as such goods tend to signify the purchasing power of those who acquire them. These items, while not necessarily being better (in quality, performance, or appearance) than their less expensive substitutes, are purchased with the main purpose of displaying wealth or income of their owners. These kinds of goods are the objects of a socio-economic phenomenon called conspicuous consumption and commonly include luxury apartments, luxury cars, watches, jewelry, designer clothing, yachts, private jets, corporate helicopters as well as large residences, urban mansions, and country houses.

== Brands ==
The idea of a luxury brand is not necessarily a product or a price point, but a mindset where core values that are expressed by a brand are directly connected to the producer's dedication and alignment to perceptions of quality with its customers' values and aspirations. Thus, it is these target customers, not the product, that make a luxury brand. Brands considered luxury connect with their customers by communicating that they are at the top of their class or considered the best in their field. Furthermore, these brands must deliver – in some meaningful way – measurably better performance.

What consumers perceive as luxurious brands and products change over the years, but there appear to be three main drivers: (1) a high price, especially when compared to other brands within its segment; (2) limited supply, in that a brand may not need to be expensive, but it arguably should not be easily obtainable and contributing to the customers' feeling that they have something special; and (3) endorsement by celebrities, which can make a brand or particular products more appealing for consumers and thus more "luxurious" in their minds. Two additional elements of luxury brands include special packaging and personalization. These differentiating elements distance the brands from the mass market and thus provide them with a unique feeling and user experience as well as a special and memorable "luxury feel" for customers.

Examples include LVMH, the largest luxury goods producer in the world with over fifty brands (including Louis Vuitton) and sales of €42.6 billion in 2017, Kering, which made €15.9 billion in revenue for a net income of €2.3 billion in 2019, and Richemont.

The luxury brand concept is now so popular that it is used in almost every retail, manufacturing, and service sector. New marketing concepts such as "mass-luxury" or "hyper luxury" further blur the definition of what is a luxury product, a luxury brand, or a luxury company. Lately, luxury brands have extended their reach to young consumers through unconventional luxury brand collaborations in which luxury brands partner with non-luxury brands seemingly at the opposite spectrum of design, image, and value. For example, luxury fashion houses partner with streetwear brands and video games.

== Boutiques ==
The sale of luxury goods requires a high level of client service, human touch, and brand consistency. Since the early 2010s, many luxury brands have invested in their own boutiques rather than wholesalers like department stores. Three of the world's biggest luxury conglomerates— LVMH, Kering, and Richemont — significantly increased the share of annual sales captured from their directly operated stores and e-commerce over the past decade.

Luxury brands use distinct boutique types to tailor the experiences of different client groups.

=== Flagship boutiques ===
Flagship boutiques are grand, multi-story boutiques in major cities that are merchandised with a wide range of collections and staffed by a large team of sales associates. They also offer supplemental services, like jewelry cleaning, hot stamping, on-site service.

Many luxury brands use flagship boutiques to illustrate their unique vision or heritage, often through distinctive architecture that transforms them from storefronts to tourist attractions.

=== Secondary boutiques ===
Large cities often have secondary boutiques in addition to their flagship boutique. Multiple boutiques allow luxury brands to cater to different types of clients, which can differ even within small geographic areas. Secondary boutiques often offer different merchandise than flagship boutiques, and establish different types of relationships with clients.

Luxury boutiques in smaller cities are often secondary boutiques as well. The rising popularity of secondary and tertiary cities around the world has pushed luxury brands to open secondary boutiques in smaller cities than those that can support a flagship boutique.

=== Seasonal boutiques ===
Luxury brands use seasonal boutiques to follow their well-off clientele as they leave major cities for smaller resort towns in the summer and winter. Common throughout Europe, seasonal boutiques have short-term leases, like a "pop-up" shop, which are open only during the resort's high season. These boutiques offer merchandise relevant to the resort where they are located, like a cruise collection in a beach resort or skiwear in a mountain resort.

== Department stores ==
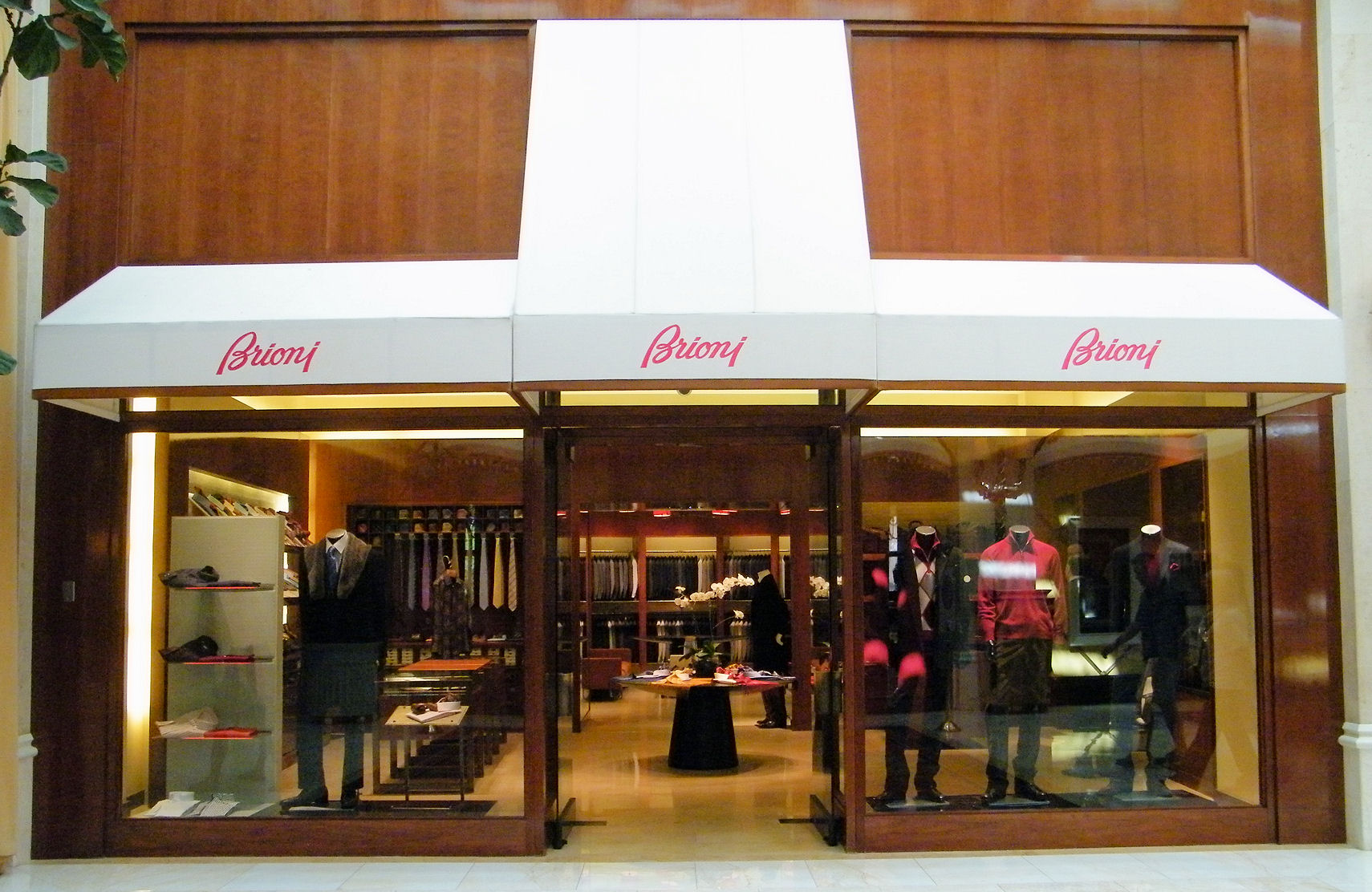
Most clothing in the world is sold in finished condition in standardized sizes. Luxury stores such as this one produce bespoke clothing—clothing specifically designed for the person buying them.

Department stores that sell major luxury brands have opened up in most major cities worldwide. Le Bon Marché in Paris, France is credited as one of the first of its kind.

Since the development of mass-market "luxury" brands in the 1800s, items from the mass-market have been converted to be sold in the luxury market. Many innovative technologies are being added to mass-market products and then transformed into luxury items to be placed in department stores.

In the United States, the development of luxury-oriented department stores not only changed the retail industry, but also ushered the idea of freedom through consumerism, and a new opportunity for middle- and upper-class women.

== Shopping districts ==
Fashion brands within the luxury goods market tend to be concentrated in affluent districts of major cities worldwide. These include:

- Amsterdam's P.C. Hooftstraat
- Abu Dhabi's Saadiyat Island
- Athens Voukourestiou Street and Kolonaki district
- Atlanta's Buckhead district
- Auckland's Orakei Local Board area
- Bangalore's UB City
- Bangkok's Pathumwan
- Barcelona's Passeig de Gràcia
- Beijing's Yabaolu
- Berlin's Kurfürstendamm
- Bogotá's Zona T
- Boston's Newbury Street
- Brisbane's Teneriffe
- Brussels Louizalaan/Avenue Louise
- Budapest's Rózsadomb district
- Buenos Aires's Recoleta
- Busan's Haeundae/Seomyeon
- Cairo's Zamalek
- Cartagena's Bocagrande
- Chicago's Oak Street and Magnificent Mile
- Dubai's Al Barsha and Jumeirah districts
- Dublin's Dublin 4 district
- Düsseldorf's Königsallee
- Florence's Via de' Tornabuoni
- Frankfurt's Goethestraße
- Guangzhou's Haizhu District
- Hamburg's Neuer Wall
- Hanoi's Trang Tien in Hoàn Kiếm district
- Hong Kong's Central, Tsim Sha Tsui
- Istanbul's Abdi İpekçi Street and İstinye Park
- Jakarta's Menteng and Kebayoran Baru
- Johannesburg's Sandton (Nelson Mandela Square)
- Kuala Lumpur's Bukit Bintang and KLCC
- Las Vegas's Strip
- Leeds Victoria Quarter
- Lisbon's Avenida da Liberdade
- London's Bond Street and Sloane Street
- Los Angeles Beverly Hills (Rodeo Drive)
- Madrid's Calle de Serrano
- Manila's Ayala Avenue
- Medellín's El Poblado
- Melbourne's Collins Street
- Montreal's Rue Sainte-Catherine
- Mexico City's Avenida Presidente Masaryk
- Miami's Star Island and Coral Gables
- Milan's Via Monte Napoleone
- Moscow's Tverskaya Street and Stoleshnikov Lane
- Munich's Maximilianstraße
- New York's Madison Avenue, Fifth Avenue and SoHo
- Paris Champs-Élysées, Avenue Montaigne and Rue du Faubourg Saint-Honoré
- Palm Beach's Worth Avenue
- Panama City's Multiplaza Pacific
- Palm Desert's El Paseo
- Perth's Dalkeith
- Philadelphia's Walnut Street
- Prague's Pařížská Street
- Rio de Janeiro's Leblon and Copacabana districts
- Rome's Via Condotti
- Reykjavík's Vesturbær and Garðabær
- San Francisco's Union Square
- San Jose's Santana Row
- San Juan, Puerto Rico's The Mall of San Juan
- Santiago's Alonso de Córdoba
- São Paulo's Jardins district and Rua Oscar Freire Street
- Saigon (Ho Chi Minh City)'s District 1
- Seoul's Cheongdam-dong
- Shanghai's Middle Huaihai Road
- Singapore's Orchard Road
- Stockholm's Biblioteksgatan
- Sydney's Castlereagh Street
- Taipei's Xinyi District
- Tel Aviv's Kikar Hamedina
- Tokyo's Ginza and Aoyama
- Toronto's Mink Mile
- Vancouver's Alberni Street
- Vienna's Innere Stadt
- Warsaw's Nowy Świat Street and Mokotowska Street
- Zürich's Bahnhofstrasse

== See also ==
- Affordable affluence
- Status symbol
- Conspicuous leisure
