= Robert Giffen =

British statistician (1837–1910)

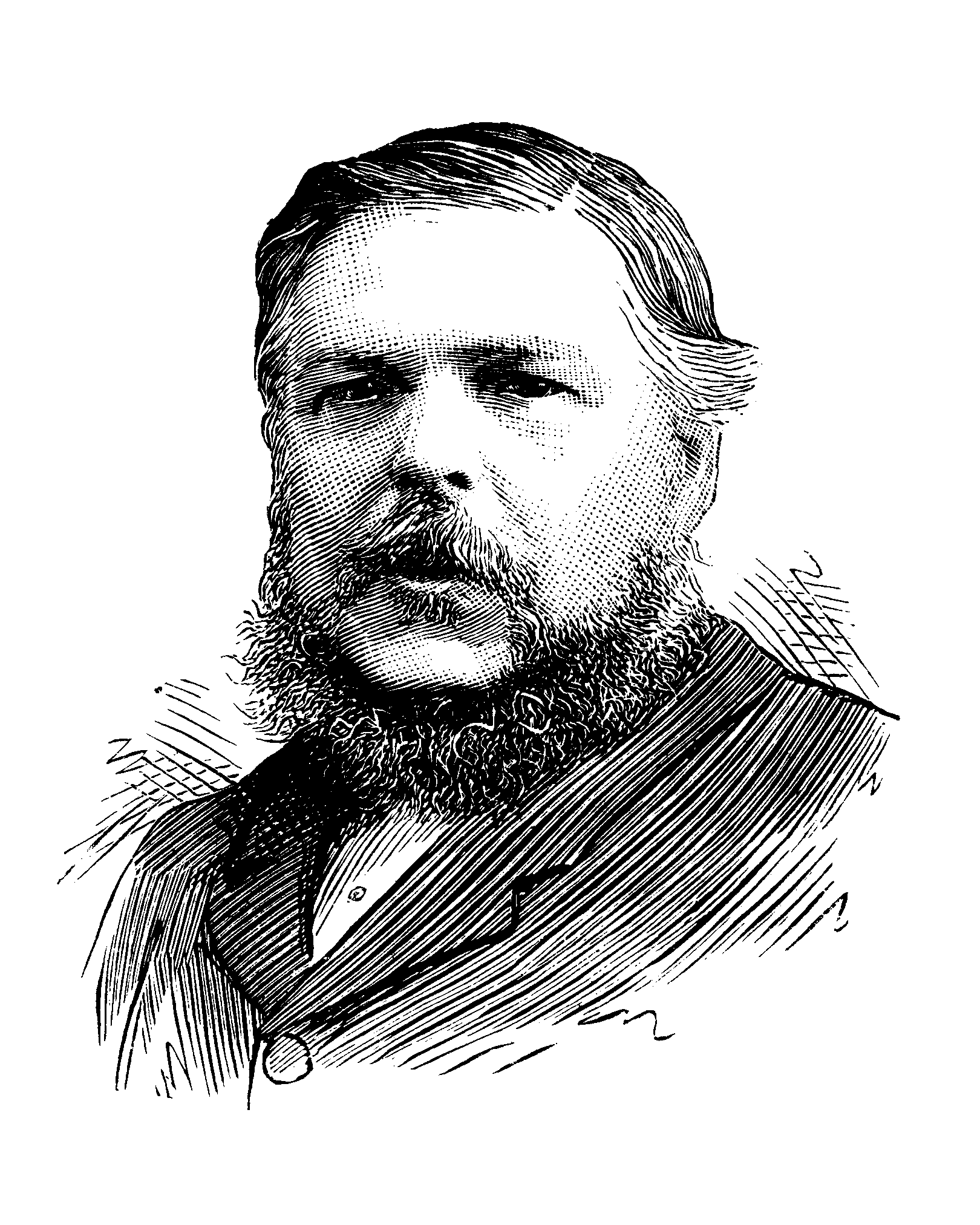
- Born: 22 July 1837; Strathaven, Lanarkshire, Scotland
- Died: 12 April 1910 (aged 72); Fort Augustus, Scotland
- Education: University of Glasgow
- Occupations: Economist, statistician

Sir Robert Giffen KCB FRS (22 July 1837 – 12 April 1910) was a Scottish statistician and economist.

== Life ==
Giffen was born at Strathaven, Lanarkshire. He entered a solicitor's office in Glasgow, and while in that city attended courses at the university. He drifted into journalism, and after working for the Stirling Journal he went to London in 1862 and joined the staff of the Globe. He also assisted John Morley, when the latter edited the Fortnightly Review. In 1868 he became Walter Bagehot's assistant-editor on The Economist; and his services were also secured in 1873 as city editor of the Daily News, and later of The Times.

His reputation as a financial journalist and statistician, gained in these years, led to his appointment in 1876 as head of the statistical department in the Board of Trade, and subsequently he became assistant secretary (1882) and finally controller-general (1892), retiring in 1897. As chief statistical adviser to the government, he drew up reports, gave evidence before commissions of inquiry, and acted as a government auditor.

Giffen was president of the Statistical Society (1882–1884); He was made a Companion of the Order of the Bath in 1891. In 1892 he was elected a Fellow of the Royal Society, and in 1894 he received the Guy Medal (gold) from the RSS. He was elected a member of the Royal Swedish Academy of Sciences in 1897.

Robert Giffen continued in later years to take a leading part in all public controversies connected with finance and taxation, and his high authority and practical experience were universally recognised. He was awarded a Knight Commander of the Order of the Bath in 1895. He died somewhat suddenly in Fort Augustus, Scotland on 12 April 1910.

== Works ==
Giffen published essays on financial subjects. His major publications were:

- American Railways as Investments (1873);
- Essays on Finance (1879 and 1884);
- The Progress of the Working Classes in the Last Half Century (1884);
- The Growth of Capital (1890);
- The Case against Bimetallism (1892); and
- Economic Inquiries and Studies (1904).

The concept of a Giffen good is named after him. Alfred Marshall wrote in the third (1895) edition of his Principles of Economics:

As Mr. Giffen has pointed out, a rise in the price of bread makes so large a drain on the resources of the poorer labouring families and raises so much the marginal utility of money to them, that they are forced to curtail their consumption of meat and the more expensive farinaceous foods: and, bread being still the cheapest food which they can get and will take, they consume more, and not less of it.

Marshall's attribution identified no corresponding passage in Giffen's writings.

On 25 March 1908, Giffen spoke at the Royal United Services Institution in London, where he predicted that a major war would shock the world credit system, which in turn would virtually halt international trade. This inspired the British Admiralty's plans for economic warfare at the outbreak of the First World War.
