= Inferior good =

Concept in economics

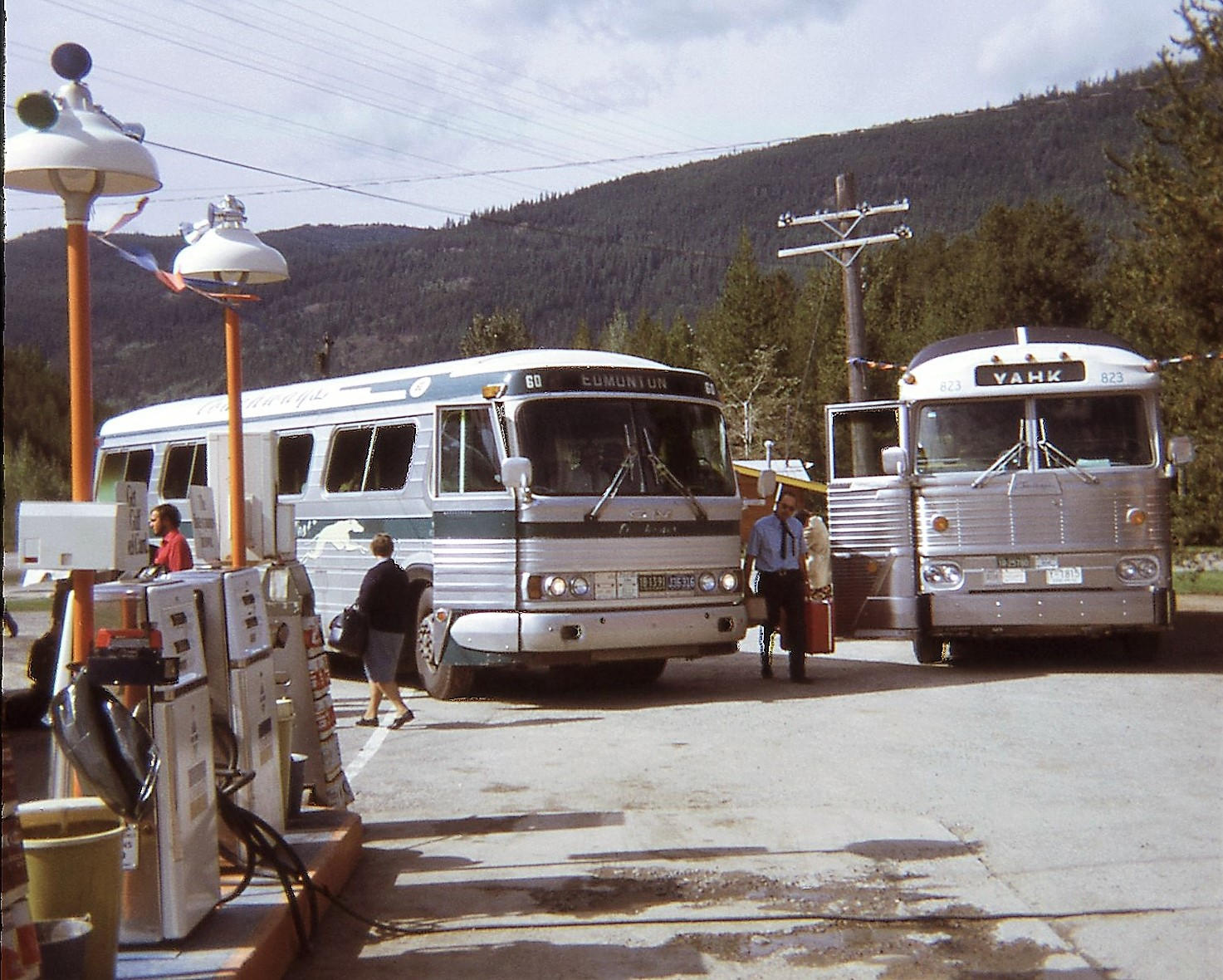
Inter-city bus services are more affordable than air travel, but the trips are much longer. As a result, inter-city bus services are an inferior good which people tend to use less as their income rises.

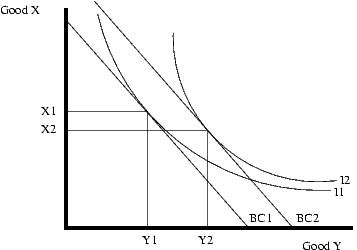
Good Y is a normal good since the amount purchased increases from Y1 to Y2 as the budget constraint shifts from BC1 to the higher income BC2. Good X is an inferior good since the amount bought decreases from X1 to X2 as income increases.

In economics, inferior goods are those goods the demand for which falls with increase in income of the consumer. So, there is an inverse relationship between income of the consumer and the demand for inferior goods. There are many examples of inferior goods, including subcompact economy cars, public transit, payday lending, second-hand clothes, and inexpensive food. The shift in consumer demand for an inferior good can be explained by two natural economic phenomena: the substitution effect and the income effect.

== Description ==
Engels curves showing income elasticity of demand (YED) of normal goods (comprising luxury (red) and necessity goods (yellow)), perfectly inelastic (green) and inferior goods (blue)

In economics, inferior goods are goods whose demand decreases when consumer income rises (or demand increases when consumer income decreases). This behaviour is unlike the supply and demand behaviour of normal goods, for which the opposite is observed; normal goods are those goods for which the demand rises as consumer income rises. Thus, an inferior good is one for which the "income elasticity of demand...is observed to be negative."

Inferiority, in this sense, is an observable fact relating to affordability rather than a statement about the quality of the good. Indeed, the same good may be a normal good for one group of consumers and an inferior good for another group. For example, for moderate-income consumers, a BMW 3 Series car might be a normal good, but for an upper-income group, it might be an inferior good.

As a rule, these goods are affordable and adequately fulfil their purpose, but as more costly substitutes that offer more utility become available, the use of the inferior goods diminishes. Direct relations can thus be drawn from the purchasing of inferior goods to socio-economic class. Those with constricted incomes tend to prefer inferior goods for the reason of the aforementioned lower cost.

Depending on consumer or market indifference curves, the amount of a good bought can either increase, decrease, or stay the same when income increases.

== Examples ==
There are many examples of inferior goods. A number of economists have suggested that shopping at large discount chains such as Walmart and rent-to-own establishments vastly represent a large percentage of goods referred to as "inferior". Subcompact economy cars are another example of an inferior good. Consumers will generally prefer these relatively inexpensive cars, which have few options, when their income is constricted. As a consumer's income increases, the demand for the economy cars will decrease, while demand for more costly cars with more options will increase, so economy cars are inferior goods.

Inter-city bus service is also an example of an inferior good. This form of transportation is cheaper than air or rail travel, but is more time-consuming. When money is constricted, traveling by bus becomes more acceptable, but when money is more abundant than time, more rapid transport is preferred. In some countries with less developed or poorly maintained railways this is reversed: trains are slower and cheaper than buses, so rail travel is an inferior good.

Certain financial services, including payday lending, are inferior goods. Such financial services are generally marketed to persons with low incomes. People with middle or higher incomes can typically use credit cards that have better terms of payment or bank loans for higher volumes and much lower rates of interest.

Inexpensive foods like instant noodles, bologna, pizza, hamburger, mass-market beer, frozen dinners, and canned goods are additional examples of inferior goods. As people's incomes rise, they tends to purchase more expensive, appealing or nutritious foods. Likewise, goods and services used by poor people for which richer people have alternatives exemplify inferior goods. As a rule, used and obsolete goods (but not antiques) marketed to persons of low income as closeouts are inferior goods at the time even if they had earlier been normal goods or even luxury goods.

Others are very inconsistent across geographic regions or cultures. The potato, for example, generally conforms to the demand function of an inferior good in the Andean region where the crop originated. People of higher incomes and/or those who have migrated to coastal areas are more likely to prefer other staples such as rice or wheat products as they can afford them. However, in several countries of Asia, such as Bangladesh, potatoes are not an inferior good, but rather a relatively expensive source of calories and a high-prestige food, especially when eaten in the form of French fries by urban elites.

Cigarettes, before they became popular, were also inferior goods in the U.S. They were seen as cheap low-class versions of cigars and the depression of 1873 boosted their popularity.

== Income and substitution effects ==
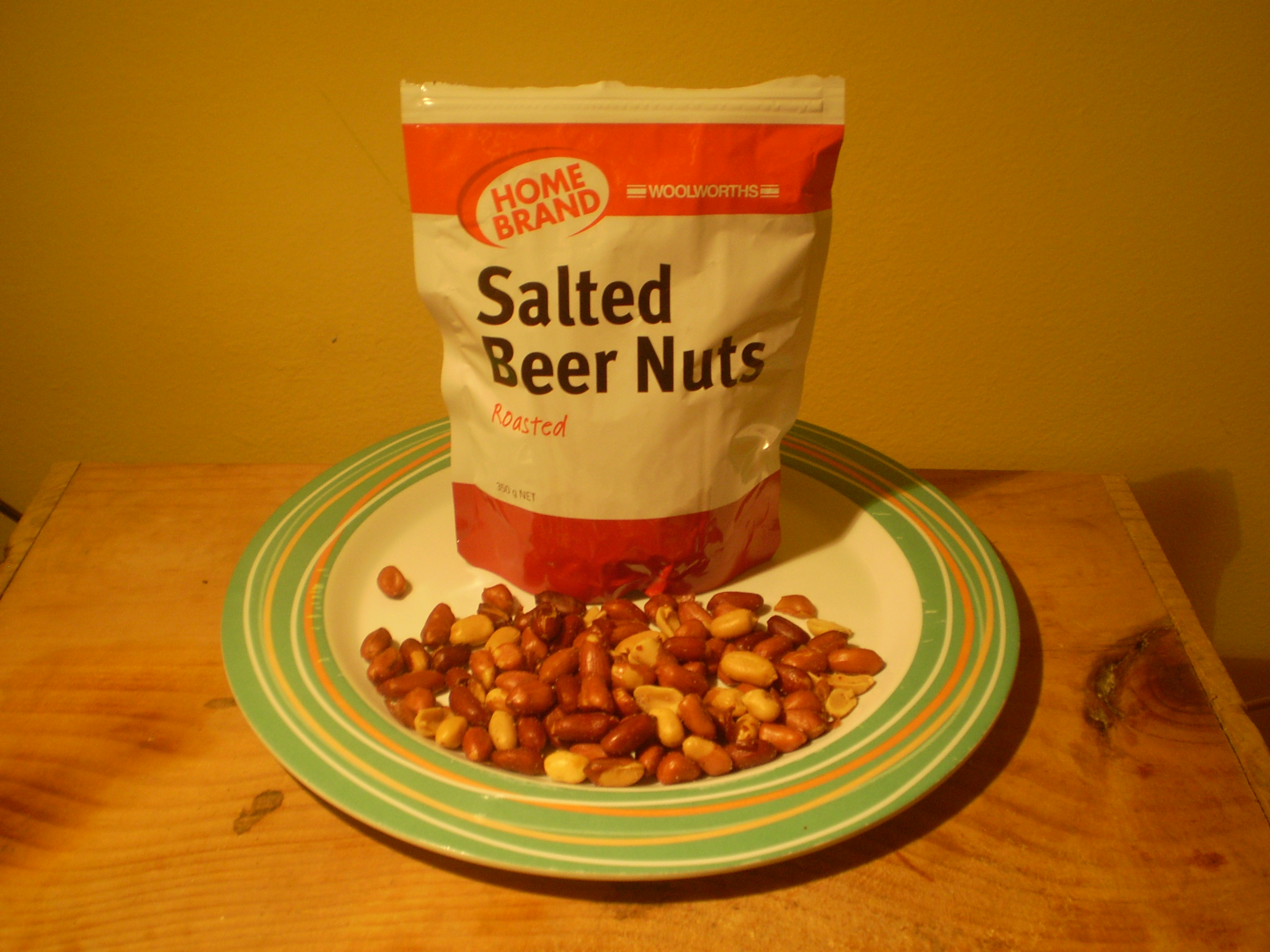
An item such as non-branded grocery products are common inferior goods.

The shift in consumer demand for an inferior good can be explained by two natural economic phenomena: The substitution effect and the income effect. These effects describe and validate the movement of the demand curve in (independent) response to increasing income and relative cost of other goods.

=== Income effect ===
The income effect describes the relationship between an increase in real income and demand for a good. Inferior goods experience negative income effect, where its consumption decreases when a consumer's income increases. The increase in real income means consumers can afford a bundle of goods that give them higher utility. Inferior goods are unlikely to provide the latter, thus why its consumption decreases.

=== Substitution effect ===
The substitution effect is the effect that a change in relative prices of substitute goods has on the quantity demanded. It is due to a change in relative prices between two or more substitute goods. When the price of a commodity falls and prices of its substitutes remain unchanged, it becomes relatively cheaper in comparison to its substitutes. In other words, its substitutes become relatively costlier. Consumers would normally like to substitute cheaper goods for costlier ones. Thus, the demand for relatively cheaper substitute commodities increases. Compared to normal goods, a price decrease (or increase) would actually decrease (or increase) the consumption of an inferior good. This is only possible if negative income effect is strong or large enough to outweigh the substitution effect.

=== Overall change in demand for an inferior good ===
The income and substitution effects work in opposite directions for an inferior good. When an inferior good's price decreases, the income effect reduces the quantity consumed, whilst the substitution effect increases the amount consumed. In practice, it has been observed that the substitution effect is usually larger than the income effect due to the small amount of gross income allocated by consumers on any given good, and thus the change in demand is usually insignificant in comparison to the substitution effect.

== Giffen goods ==
A special type of inferior good may exist known as the Giffen good, which would disobey the "law of demand". Quite simply, when the price of a Giffen good increases, the demand for that good increases. This would have to be a particular good that is such a large proportion of a person or market's consumption that the income effect of a price increase would produce, effectively, more demand. The observed demand curve would slope upward, indicating positive elasticity.

Giffen goods were first noted by Sir Robert Giffen. It is usual to attribute Giffen's observation to the fact that in Ireland during the 19th century there was a rise in the price of potatoes. The explanation follows that poor people were forced to reduce their consumption of meat and expensive items such as eggs. Potatoes, still being the cheapest food, meant that poor people started consuming more even though its price was rising. This phenomenon is often described as "Giffen's Paradox". However, it has been noticed that Giffen did not use potatoes as an example of Giffen goods. Moreover, potatoes were not Giffen Goods during the Great Famine in Ireland. Alfred Marshall's explanation of Giffen's Paradox was presented in terms of bread.

== See also ==
- Ersatz
- Substitute good
- Kuznets curve
- Veblen good
- Giffen good
