= Normal good =

Good that increases in demand when incomes rise

Example of a normal good: As income increases from B1 to B3, the outward movement of utility curve I dictates that the quantity of good X^{1} increases in tandem. Therefore, X^{1} is a normal good. Put another way, the positively sloped income consumption curve demonstrates that X^{1} is normal. The Engel curve of X^{1} would also be positively sloped.

In economics, a normal good is a type of a good for which consumers increase their demand due to an increase in income, unlike inferior goods, for which the opposite is observed. When there is an increase in a person's income, for example due to a wage rise, a good for which the demand rises due to the wage increase, is referred as a normal good. Conversely, the demand for normal goods declines when the income decreases, for example due to a wage decrease or layoffs.

Whether a good is categorized as a normal good or an inferior good is based on empirical observations, not some essential element of a good. Indeed, the same good may be a normal good for one group of consumers and an inferior good for another group. For example, for moderate-income consumers, a BMW 3 Series car might be a normal good, but for an upper-income group, it might be an inferior good.

== Analysis ==
There is a positive correlation between the income and demand for normal goods, that is, the changes income and demand for normal goods moves in the same direction. That is to say, that normal goods have an elastic relationship for the demand of a good with the income of the person consuming the good.

In economics, the concept of elasticity, and specifically income elasticity of demand is key to explain the concept of normal goods. Income elasticity of demand measures the magnitude of the change in demand for a good in response to a change in consumer income. the income elasticity of demand is calculated using the following formula,

Income elasticity of demand= % change in quantity demanded / % change in consumer income.

In mathematical terms, the formula can be written as follows:

$\xi_i= \frac{\Delta Q_ / Q}{\Delta Y / Y}$, where $Q$ is the original quantity demanded and $Y$ is the original income, before any change.

A good is classified as a normal good when the income elasticity of demand is greater than zero and has a value less than one. If we look into a simple hypothetical example, the demand for apples increases by 10% for a 30% increase in income, then the income elasticity for apples would be 0.33 and hence apples are considered to be a normal good.

=== Comparison with luxury goods ===
Other types of goods like luxury goods and necessities are also classified using the income elasticity of demand. The income elasticity of demand for luxury goods is greater than one, while for necessities it is less than one. Luxury goods have a positive correlation of demand and income, but a greater proportion of income is spent on a luxury item, for example, a sports car. On the other hand, with necessities or normal goods, people spend a smaller proportion of their income. Practically, a higher-income group of people spend more on luxury items and a lower-income group of people spend more of their income on necessities or normal goods.

However, the classification of normal and luxury goods vary from person to person. A good that is considered to be a normal good to a lot of people may be considered to be luxury good to someone else. This depends on a lot of factors such as geographical locations, socio-economic conditions in a country, local traditions and many more. For example, in the 1980s in the Soviet Union, regular consumer items imported from the United States, such as Levis blue jeans and popular music cassettes, were costly, rare luxury goods.

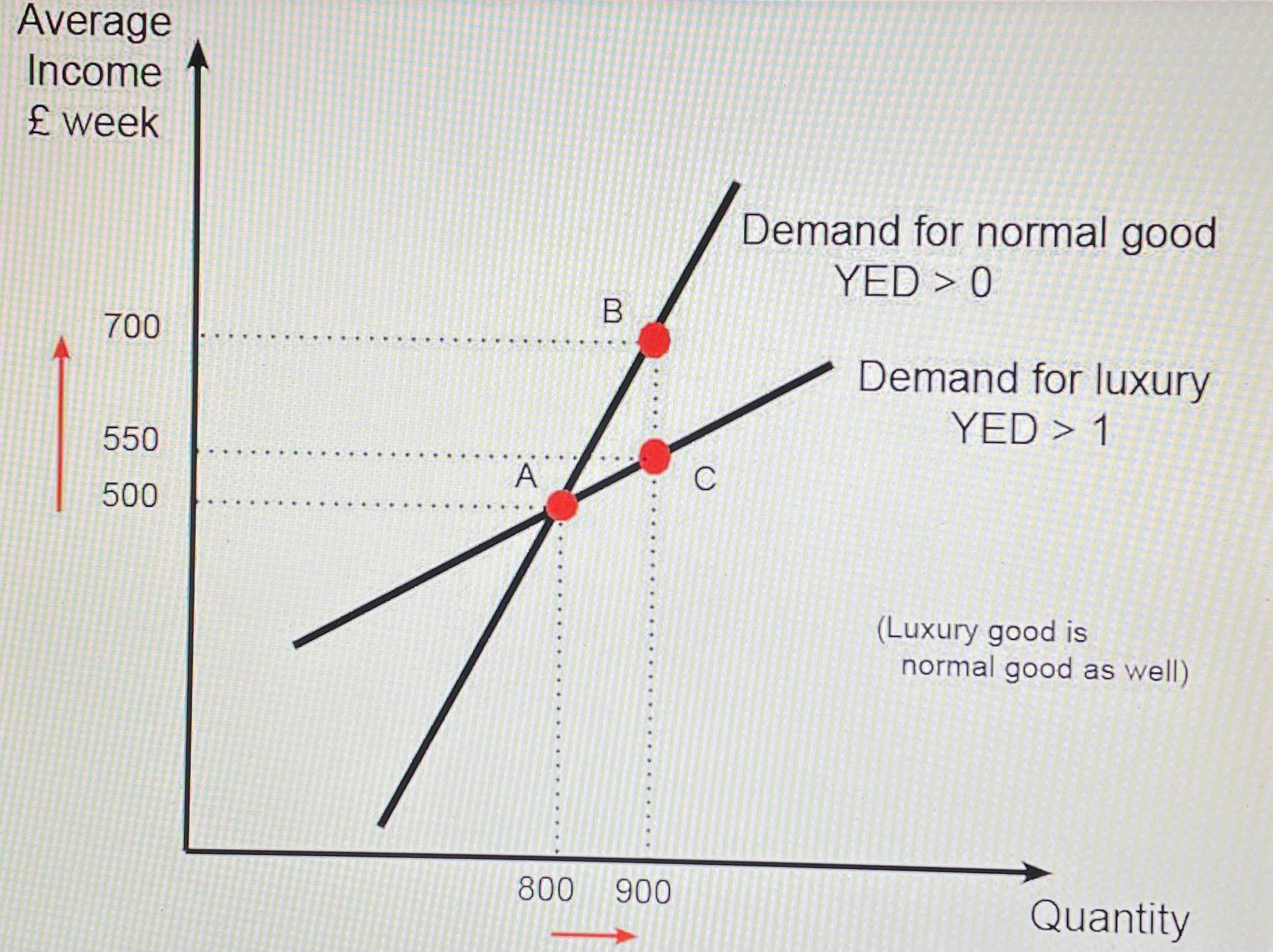
The graph shows the change in demand for both normal goods and luxury goods due to a change in income. When the income rises from 500 to 700, the quantity demanded for normal goods rises from 800 to 900.

=== Normal goods and consumer behaviour ===
The demand for normal goods are determined by many types of consumer behaviour. A rise in income leads to a change in consumer behaviour. When income increases, consumers are able to afford goods that they could not consume before an income rise. The purchasing power of consumers increases. In this situation, the demand rises because of the attractiveness to consumers. The goods are attractive to the consumers maybe because they are high in quality and functionality and also the goods may help to maintain a certain socio economic prestige. Individual consumers have unique behavioural characteristics and they have their preferences accordingly.

According to economic theory, there must be at least one normal good in any given bundle of goods (i.e. not all goods can be inferior). Economic theory assumes that a good always provides marginal utility (holding everything else equal). Therefore, if consumption of all goods decrease when income increases, the resulting consumption combination would fall short of the new budget constraint frontier. This would violate the economic rationality assumption.

When the price of a normal good is zero, the demand is infinite.

== Examples ==
Examples of normal vs. inferior goods
Category	Normal good	Inferior good
Food and drink	Fine dining; Beer; Wine; Water	Rice; Instant noodles; Super market own brand coffee
Transportation	Sports cars; Luxury cars	Low-end used cars; Intercity bus service; Bus travel
Other	Clothing; Household appliances; Consumer durables; Gym memberships; Vacations; Jewelry; Ordinary broadband; electronics	Discount store goods (e.g. Walmart); Pirated goods; Cigarettes

A caveat to the table above is that not all goods are strictly normal or inferior across all income levels. For example, average used cars could have a positive income elasticity of demand at low income levels – extra income could be funnelled into replacing public transportation with self-commuting. However, the income elasticity of demand of average used cars could turn negative at higher income levels, where the consumer may elect to purchase new and/or luxury cars instead.

As well, another caveat is that the categorization depends on which studies one uses. Piros and Pinto note that one study indicates that beer, which has a slightly negative income elasticity of demand is an inferior good and wine, which has a "significantly positive" income elasticity of demand, is a normal good.

Another potential caveat is brought up by "The Notion of Inferior Good in the Public Economy" by Professor Jurion of University of Liège (published 1978). Public goods such as online news are often considered inferior goods. However, the conventional distinction between inferior and normal goods may be blurry for public goods. (At least, for goods that are non-rival enough that they are conventionally understood as "public goods.") Consumption of many public goods will decrease when a rational consumer's income rises, due to replacement by private goods, e.g. building a private garden to replace use of public parks. But when effective congestion costs to a consumer rises with the consumer's income, even a normal good with a low income elasticity of demand (independent of the congestion costs associated with the non-excludable nature of the good) will exhibit the same effect. This makes it difficult to distinguish inferior public goods from normal ones.

Engels curves showing income elasticity of demand (YED) of normal goods (comprising luxury (red) and necessity goods (yellow)), perfectly inelastic (green) and inferior goods (blue)

== See also ==
- Consumer theory
- Superior good
- Ordinary good
- Giffen good
