= Elasticity =

Elasticity often refers to:

- Elasticity (physics), continuum mechanics of bodies that deform reversibly under stress

Elasticity may also refer to:

== Information technology ==
- Elasticity (data store), the flexibility of the data model and the clustering
- Elasticity (system resource), a defining feature of distributed system

== Economics ==
Elasticity (economics), a general term for a ratio of change. For more specific economic forms of elasticity, see:

- Cross elasticity of demand
- Elasticity of substitution
- Frisch elasticity of labor supply
- Income elasticity of demand
- Output elasticity
- Price elasticity of demand
- Price elasticity of supply
- Yield elasticity of bond value

== Mathematics ==
- Elasticity of a function, a mathematical definition of point elasticity
- Arc elasticity

== Molecular and Cell Biology ==
- Elasticity coefficient, a biochemical term used in metabolic control analysis

== Other uses ==
- Elasticity, a 2021 EP by Serj Tankian

== See also ==
- Elastic (disambiguation)
