= Total revenue test =

In economics, the total revenue test is a means for determining whether demand is elastic or inelastic. If an increase in price causes an increase in total revenue, then demand can be said to be inelastic, since the increase in price does not have a large impact on quantity demanded. If an increase in price causes a decrease in total revenue, then demand can be said to be elastic, since the increase in price has a large impact on quantity demanded.

Different commodities may have different elasticities depending on whether people need them (necessities) or want them (accessories).

Examples:

- Product A currently sells for $10. The seller decides to increase the price to $15, but finds that he ends up making less money. This is because he is selling fewer of the product due to the increased price, and his total revenue has fallen. The demand for this product must be elastic.
- Product A currently sells for $10. The seller decides to increase the price to $15, and finds that his revenue ends up increasing. The demand for this product must be inelastic.

== Mathematical explanation ==
The mathematical link between them comes from the formula of the price elasticity of demand:

$$E_d = - \left(\left(Q_2-Q_1\right)/ \left(P_2- P_1\right)\right) \cdot \left(P_1/Q_1\right)$$

where $P$ stands for Price, $Q$ for quantity demanded, $\left(Q_2-Q_1\right)$ for change in quantity demanded, and $\left(P_2-P_1\right)$ for change in price. Here the minus sign converts the result to a non-negative number, as is conventional but not universal.

Using the idea of limits for infinitesimal changes in price and therefore in quantity, the formula becomes

$$E_d = - \frac{dQ}{dP} \cdot \frac{P}{Q}$$

Total revenue is given by $TR=P \cdot Q$.

Since quantity demanded Q is a function of price P, $Q = f(P),$ total revenue can be rewritten as

$$TR=P \cdot f(P).$$

The derivative of total revenue with respect to P is thus:

$$\frac{dTR}{dP} = 1 \cdot f(P) + P \cdot f'(P)$$

But $Q = f(P)$, so $\frac{dTR}{dP} = f'(P) \cdot P + Q$.

After both multiplying and dividing by $Q$, the equation can be rewritten as:

$$\frac{dTR}{dP} = Q\left(f'(P) \cdot \frac{P}{Q} + 1\right).$$

The last step is to substitute the elasticity of demand for $-f'(P) \cdot \frac{P}{Q}$ to obtain:

$$\frac{dTR}{dP} = Q(-E_d + 1) = Q(1 - E_d)$$.

To find the elasticity of demand using the mathematical explanation of the total revenue test, it's necessary to use the following rule:

If demand is elastic, $E_d > 1 \!\$, then $\dfrac{dR}{dP} < 0 \!\$: price and total revenue move in opposite directions. If demand is inelastic, $E_d < 1 \!\$, then $\dfrac{dR}{dP} > 0 \!\$: price and total revenue change in the same direction. If demand is unit elastic, $E_d = 1$, then $\frac{dR}{dP} = 0$: an increase in price has no influence on the total revenue.

== Graphical explanation ==
Total revenue, the product price times the quantity of the product demanded, can be represented at an initial point by a rectangle with corners at the following four points on the demand graph: price (P_{1}), quantity demanded (Q_{1}), point A on the demand curve, and the origin (the intersection of the price axis and the quantity axis).

The area of the rectangle anchored by point A is the measure of total revenue.

When the price changes the rectangle changes. The change in revenue caused by the price change is called the price effect, and the change In revenue in the opposite direction caused by the resulting quantity change is called the quantity effect.

When the price changes from $P_1$ to $P_2$ the magnitude of the price effect is represented by the rectangle $P_1 P_2 CA$ and the magnitude of the quantity effect is given by rectangle $Q_1 Q_2 BC$. The price effect is the loss of revenue from selling the original quantity at the lower price; the quantity effect is the added revenue earned at the new price on the newly induced units sold.

So, if the area of the rectangle giving the price effect is greater than the area of the rectangle giving the quantity effect, demand is inelastic: $E_d < 1 \!\$. If the reverse is true, demand is elastic: $E_d > 1 \!\$. If the sizes are equal, demand is unit elastic (or unitary elastic).
