= Cross elasticity of demand =

Economic measure of a good's price change

In economics, the cross (or cross-price) elasticity of demand (XED) measures the effect of changes in the price of one good on the quantity demanded of another good. This reflects the fact that the quantity demanded of good is dependent on not only its own price (price elasticity of demand) but also the price of other "related" good.

The cross elasticity of demand is calculated as the ratio between the percentage change of the quantity demanded for a good and the percentage change in the price of another good, ceteris paribus:
$$\text{XED}
= \frac{\%\text{ change in quantity demanded of good A}}{\%\text{ change in price of good B}}$$
The sign of the cross elasticity indicates the relationship between two goods. A negative cross elasticity denotes two products that are complements, while a positive cross elasticity denotes two products are substitutes. If products A and B are complements, an increase in the price of B leads to a decrease in the quantity demanded for A, as A is used in conjunction with B. Equivalently, if the price of product B decreases, the demand curve for product A shifts to the right reflecting an increase in A's demand, resulting in a negative value for the cross elasticity of demand. If A and B are substitutes, an increase in the price of B will increase the market demand for A, as customers would easily replace B with A, like McDonald's and Domino's Pizza.

== History ==
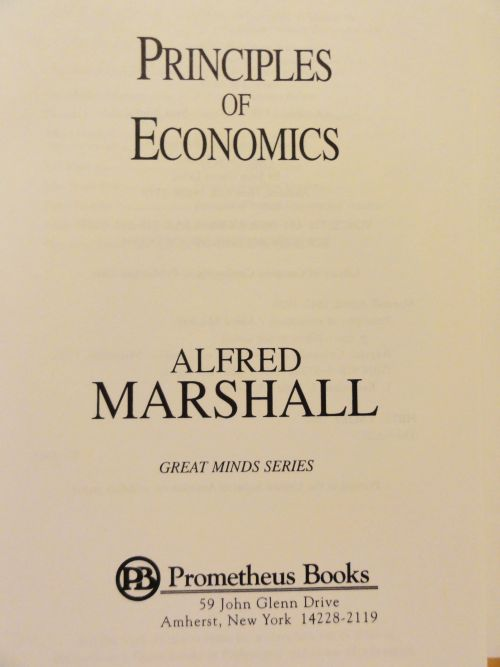
Alfred Marshall's book, where the concept 'price elasticity of demand' originated from

The concept of "price elasticity of demand" originated by Alfred Marshall predicted relative changes between price and quantity. In the Cellophane case, Professor Stocking believed that a change in the price of one product will induce a price change of its rivalry in the same direction, so he firstly regarded that movement of two prices in the same direction explicitly reflects a high cross-price elasticity. However, during 1924–1940, du Pont cellophane prices moved independently from its perceived competitors' (waxed paper, vegetable parchment, etc.) price; independent price movements reflect noncompetitive pricing between cellophane and its rival products. Thus, Professor Stocking's emphasis on the same movement of prices was too rigid, as the price of cellophane changed induced by three factors:

1. Change in demand due to price change of rival products
2. The production function of the cellophane
3. The slope and position of the cost curves of rival products.

In other words, the competitive relationship between two goods (cross-price elasticity) can not be simply concluded by price change, as price change arises from both cost and demand factors. Furthermore, instead of a high positive or low positive elasticity concluded by observing respective price change, cross-elasticity of demand should be either positive or negative to represent if there is a complementary or substitutive relationship between two goods.

== Calculation and interpretation ==
Cross elasticity of demand of product B with respect to product A (η_{BA}):

$$\eta_{BA}=\frac{\Delta Q_B/Q_B}{\Delta P_A/P_A} = \frac{P_A}{Q_B} \cdot \frac{\Delta Q_B}{\Delta P_A}$$

$\eta_{BA}>0$ implies two goods are substitutes. Consumers purchase more B when the price of A increases. Example: the cross elasticity of demand of butter with respect to margarine is 0.81, so 1% increase in the price of margarine will increase the demand for butter by 0.81%.

$\eta_{BA}<0$ implies two goods are complements. Consumers purchase less B when the price of A increases. Example: the cross elasticity of demand of entertainment with respect to food is −0.72, so 1% increase in the price of food will decrease the demand for entertainment by 0.72%.

$\eta_{BA}=0$ implies two goods are independent (a price change of good A is unrelated to demand change of good B), so changes in the price of product A have no effect on the demand for Product B. Example: bread and cloths .

Interpretation of cross elasticity of demand
If the sign of cross elasticity of demand is...	the elasticity range	the goods are
negative	−∞	perfect complements
negative	(−∞，0)	highly or somewhat complements
0	0	unrelated goods (neither complements or substitutes)
positive	(0, +∞)	somewhat or highly substitutes
positive	+∞	perfect substitutes

=== Degree of response ===
The higher the positive cross elasticity of demand, the more substitutable two products are; thus, the more competition between them. Similarly, the lower the negative cross elasticity of demand, the more complementary two goods are. In general, monopolies usually possess a low-positive cross elasticity of demand with respect to their competitors.

==== Elastic demand ====
If the absolute value of the cross elasticity of demand is greater than 1, the cross elasticity of demand is elastic, this means that a change in price of good A results in a more than proportionate change in quantity demanded for good B. In other words, a change in price of good A has a relatively high impact on the change in quantity demanded for good B.
$$|XED|>1$$

==== Inelastic demand ====
If the absolute value of the cross elasticity of demand between 1 and 0, the cross elasticity of demand is inelastic, this means that a change in price of good A results in a less than proportionate change in quantity demanded for good B. In other words, a change in price of good A has a relatively small impact on the change in quantity demanded for good B.
$$0<|XED|<1$$

==== Unitary demand ====
If the value of the cross elasticity of demand is 1, the cross elasticity of demand is unitary, this means that a change in price of good A results in an exactly proportionate change in quantity demanded for good B.
$$XED=1$$

== Results for main types of goods ==
For two goods, fuel and new cars (consists of fuel consumption), are complements; that is, one is used with the other. In these cases the cross elasticity of demand will be negative, as shown by the decrease in demand for cars when the price for fuel will rise. In the case of perfect substitutes, the cross elasticity of demand is equal to positive infinity (at the point when both goods can be consumed). Where the two goods are independent, or, as described in consumer theory, if a good is independent in demand then the demand of that good is independent of the quantity consumed of all other goods available to the consumer, the cross elasticity of demand will be zero i.e. if the price of one good changes, there will be no change in demand for the other good.

Two goods that complement each other show a negative cross elasticity of demand: as the price of good Y rises, the demand for good X falls

Two goods that are substitutes have a positive cross elasticity of demand: as the price of good Y rises, the demand for good X rises

Two goods that are independent have a zero cross elasticity of demand: as the price of good Y rises, the demand for good X stays constant

When goods are substitutable, the diversion ratio, which quantifies how much of the displaced demand for product j switches to product i, is measured by the ratio of the cross-elasticity to the own-elasticity multiplied by the ratio of product i's demand to product j's demand. In the discrete case, the diversion ratio is naturally interpreted as the fraction of product j demand which treats product i as a second choice, measuring how much of the demand diverting from product j because of a price increase is diverted to product i can be written as the product of the ratio of the cross-elasticity to the own-elasticity and the ratio of the demand for product i to the demand for product j. In some cases, it has a natural interpretation as the proportion of people buying product j who would consider product i their "second choice".

Approximate estimates of the cross price elasticities of preference-independent bundles of goods (e.g. food and education, healthcare and clothing, etc.) can be calculated from the income elasticities of demand and market shares of individual bundles, using established models of demand based on a differential approach.

=== Selected cross price elasticities of demand ===
Below are some examples of the cross-price elasticity of demand (XED) for various goods:

Good	Good with price change	XED
Butter	Margarine	+0.81
Beef	Pork	+0.28
Entertainment	Food	−0.72

== Application and Implication ==
An enterprise needs to understand the cross-elastic demand for a product or service. Cross-elastic demand can help enterprises set prices and identify the sensitivity of others to their products. For example, a strategic "loss leader" takes advantage of the negative cross elasticity of demand for complementary commodities to price in a counterintuitive way deliberately. A company can sell one of its goods for less than the cost of making it and thus promote sales of its complementary products. Large profits on complementary products can make up for net losses in the business of its main products. Many large companies use this strategy, such as Sony. Sony's PlayStation consoles are sold below the cost of making them, encouraging the sale of games. Games and consoles are almost perfectly complementary. The reduction in the price of consoles will significantly increase the demand for games. As a result, Sony can make up for its net losses in the console business by making big profits in games

Besides, unique and irreplaceable products enable companies to sell their products at higher prices. Because of the uniqueness of the product, companies do not worry too much about consumers switching to other products. However, the specific price setting should also follow the demand curve of the commodity. Suppose the elasticity of demand for the product is greater than 1. In that case, it means that a slight change in the product's price will cause a significant reduction in the consumer demand for the product. Therefore, companies should first make a careful study of the elasticity of demand for their products before setting prices. It ensures a broader profit range for the company. A real-life example is Apple. Apple used iOS, which is different from Android, at the beginning of the launch of their phones. The clean and straightforward interface is an irreplaceable advantage of this system. Apple, meanwhile, has its unique text-message tone and call ringtone. In many small ways, Apple is building uniqueness. Phone users who are used to iOS develop a habit that makes it difficult to adapt to other systems, such as Android.

Finally, the providers of substitutes need to be aware of the competitors of their products through detailed market research. The company can reduce the sensitivity of competitors' products by increasing customer loyalty. For example, the recently hot quality stars are invited to endorse their company's products. It can attract some of the star's loyalists to the product, thus increasing the overall loyalty. Alternatively, the company could spend more money on advertising to make consumers aware of the difference between its product and that of its competitors.

=== Contribution to policy improvement ===
The UK and Scottish governments intended to use price-based policy interventions, like setting minimum unit pricing and increasing taxation to reduce alcohol consumption and mediate the related harms among their population. Estimation of cross-price elasticities of alcohol in respect to other related beverages helps set price-based policy interventions, as it measures the percentage change in demand for one type of alcohol due to a 1% change in the price of another type of beverage. For example, the cross elasticity of demand for wine in respect to the price change of spirit is 0.05, which implies that a 1% price decrease for Spirit will reduce market demand for wine by 0.05%. Therefore, the cross elasticity of demand enables policymakers to take better control of the policy effects, thus, reducing the risk for mortality, morbidity, and other social harms caused by over-drinking.

=== Contribution to the sustainable supply chain ===
A high coefficient of negative cross-price elasticity implies that the sales of product A are decided by the sales of product B. If the demand of A significantly depends on the demand of B, there must be a reduction in the profit of A. In this case, the cross elasticity of demand is a reminder to the firms to cautiously selecting products with high dependence on complements. On the other hand, the high-positive cross elasticity of demand reflects high substitutability of goods, which means customers' demand can be fulfilled by other products easily. Businesses that understand the implications of high-positive cross elasticity of demand can reduce their operating risk by avoiding overstock, thus, maintaining a sustainable supply chain.

=== Contribution to firm reactions ===
Knowledge of a firm's cross elasticity of demand and their competitors' allows them to map out the market, enabling them to calculate the number of rivals and the importance of their complementary (and substitute) products relative to their own. Firms can develop strategies to reduce their exposure to the risks they are imposed to by price changes of other firms, such as an increase in the price of a complement or a decrease in the price of a substitute.

=== Potential strategies ===
==== Horizontal integration ====
In markets with few competitors, cross elasticity between rivals are likely to be high, this makes firms in the market vulnerable to price competition. Horizontal integration, usually mergers, could reduce said risks by reducing competition in the market. For example, when Anheuser-Busch InBev (the world's biggest brewer at the time) acquired SABMiller (InBev's closest rival) in 2015, it was one of the biggest takeover of a British firm, creating the world's first global brewer. The takeover created a brewing empire that produces a third of the world's beer.

==== Vertical integration ====
Firms may gain better control of the market by merging with suppliers of complementary products. Developing their own complementary products is another possible solution. For example, Google developing Google Pixel is an attempt by Google to capture the smartphone market share by integrating both its software and hardware features for improved performance while being more resource efficient.

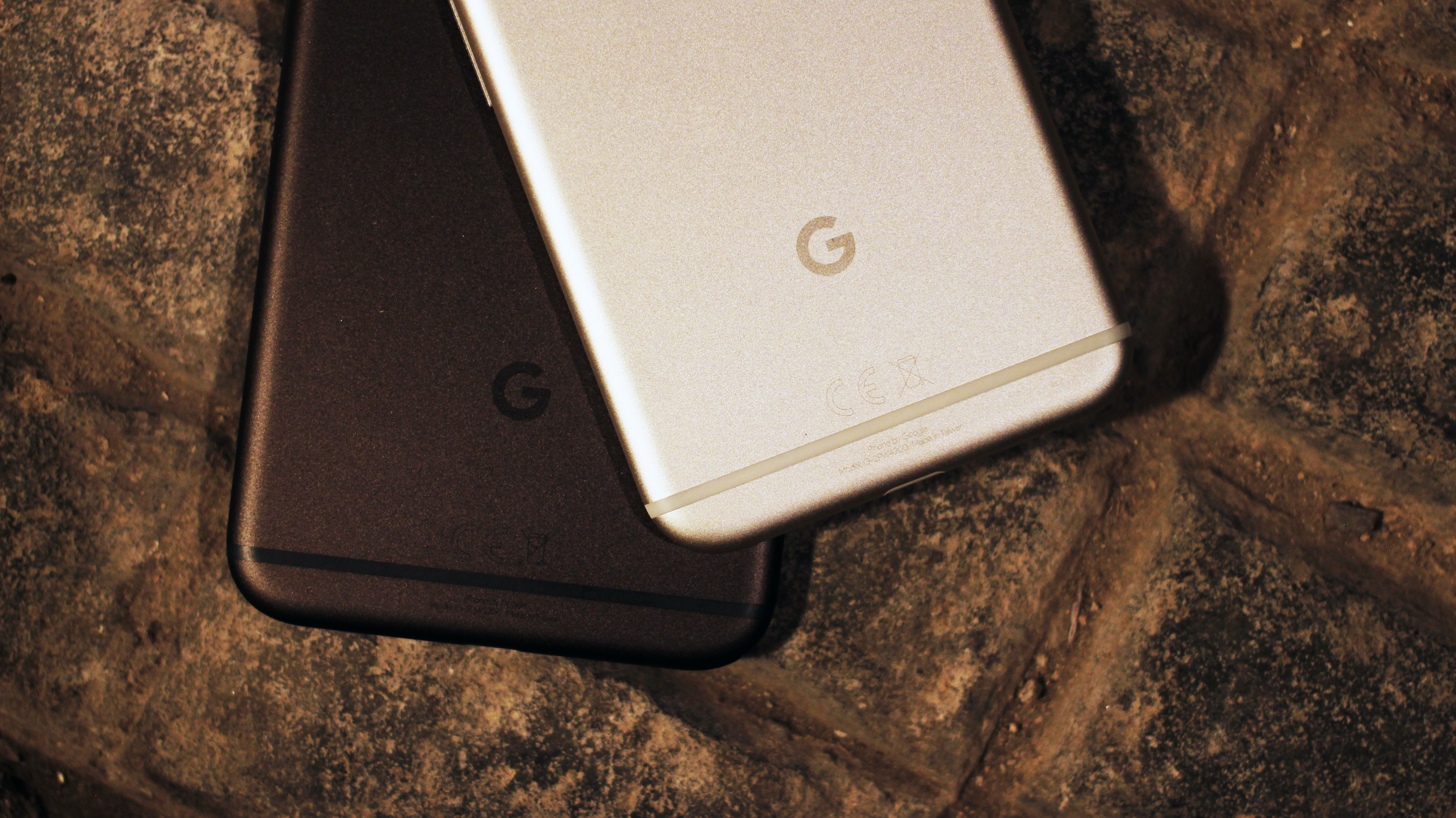
Google Pixel and Pixel XL smartphones

==== Alliances and collusion ====
Competitors may pool resources to create a joint alliance, such as Sony-Ericsson in October 2001. Sony had a share of less than 1% in the mobile phone market; while Ericsson was the third largest market share holder. Unfortunately, Ericsson relied heavily on a single supplier, and when a fire broke out at a Phillips factory, Ericsson couldn't fulfill their orders. Sony wanted a greater market share and Ericsson wanted to avoid going out of business, hence the Sony-Ericsson joint venture was formed.

Firms entering into a price fixing agreement in order to avoid price wars means they are involved in a collusion. The chances of collusion to occur is higher in markets with few competitors such as oligopolistic markets. It is illegal according to antitrust laws, even though collusive agreements may be implicit, its implication with cartels are the same.

== See also ==
- Economics
- Supply and demand
- Elasticity (economics)
- Price elasticity of demand
- Price elasticity of supply
- Income elasticity of demand
- Arc elasticity
- Yield elasticity of bond value
