= Advertising elasticity of demand =

Advertising elasticity of demand (or simply advertising elasticity, often shortened to AED) is an elasticity measuring the effect of an increase or decrease in advertising on a market. Traditionally, it is considered as being positively related, demand for the good that is subject of the advertising campaign can be inversely related to the amount spent if the advertising is negative.

== Definition ==
Good advertising will result in a positive shift in demand for a good. AED is used to measure the effectiveness of this strategy in increasing demand versus its cost. Mathematically, then, AED measures the percentage change in the quantity of a good demanded induced by a given percentage often change in spending on advertising in that sector:

$$AED = \frac{\%\ \mbox{change in quantity demanded}}{\%\ \mbox{change in spending on advertising}} = \frac{\Delta Q_d/Q_d}{\Delta A/A}$$

In other words, the percentage by which sales will increase after a 1% increase in advertising expenditure, assuming all other factors remain equal (ceteris paribus). AED is usually positive. Negative advertising may, however, result in a negative AED.

== Applications ==
AED can be used to make sure advertising expenses are in line. Consequently, an increase in demand might not be the only desired outcome of advertising. The rule of thumb combines the AED with a known price elasticity of demand (PED) for the same good. The optimal relationship is denoted by:

$$\frac{\mbox{Advertising expenditure}}{\mbox{Sales revenue}} = -\frac{AED}{PED}\mbox{ or, symbolically, }\frac{A}{P.Q} = -\frac{E_A}{E_P}$$

Thus, "to maximize profit, the firm's advertising to sales ratio should be equal to minus the ratio of the advertising and price elasticities of demand." As noted by Pindyck and Rubinfeld, firms should advertise heavily if their AED is high (they get a lot of bang for their advertising buck) or if their PED is low (since for every added sale there is significant profit).

Moreover, a comparison of PED and AED can also be used to determine whether more advertising is the correct strategy to maximise profits (e.g. for Heinz in the market for baked beans), or changing prices (as with supermarket own brands).

== Examples ==
The following are for industry-wide AEDs, researched in the United States:

- Beer: 0.0
- Wine: 0.08
- Cigarettes: 0.04
- Recreation: 0.08
