= Price elasticity of supply =

Measure in economics

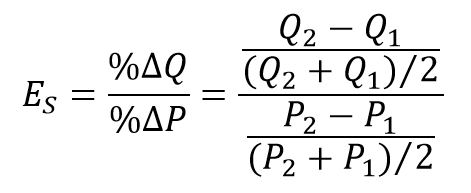
Price elasticity of supply using the midpoint method.

The price elasticity of supply (PES or E_{s}) is commonly known as “a measure used in economics to show the responsiveness, or elasticity, of the quantity supplied of a good or service to a change in its price.” Price elasticity of supply, in application, is the percentage change of the quantity supplied resulting from a 1% change in price. Alternatively, PES is the percentage change in the quantity supplied divided by the percentage change in price.

When PES is less than one, the supply of the good can be described as inelastic. When price elasticity of supply is greater than one, the supply can be described as elastic. An elasticity of zero indicates that quantity supplied does not respond to a price change: the good is "fixed" in supply. Such goods often have no labor component or are not produced, limiting the short run prospects of expansion. If the elasticity is exactly one, the good is said to be unit-elastic. Differing from price elasticity of demand, price elasticities of supply are generally positive numbers because an increase in the price of a good motivates producers to produce more, as relative marginal revenue increases.

The quantity of goods supplied can, in the short term, be different from the amount produced, as manufacturers will have stocks which they can build up or run down.

== Definition and real-life example ==
The slope of a supply curve relates changes in price to changes in quantity supplied. A steeper curve means that price changes are correlated with relatively small quantity changes. Steep supply curves derive that the quantity supplied by producers are not particularly sensitive to price changes. Oppositely, flatter supply curves imply that price changes are associated with large quantity changes. Markets with flat supply curves will see large movements in quantity supplied as prices change.

The concept of elasticity expresses the responsiveness of a value to changes in another (particularly, responsiveness of quantities to prices). An elasticity is the ratio of the percentage change in one value to the percentage change in another. The concept of elasticity applies to demand and supply curves and agents like producers and consumers.

$E^S =\left ( \frac{%\bigtriangleup Q^S}{%\bigtriangleup P} \right )$

Suppose that there is an increase in demand for apartments. There will be a shortage of apartments at the old level of apartment rents and pressure on rents (price) to increase. Ceteris paribus, the more responsive (elastic) the quantity of apartments supplied is to changes in monthly rents, the lower the increase in rent required to eliminate the shortage and to bring the market back to equilibrium. Conversely, if quantity supplied is less responsive (inelastic) to price changes, price will have to increase more to eliminate a shortage caused by an increase in demand.

== Determinants ==
Availability of raw materials
For example, availability may cap the amount of gold that can be produced in a country regardless of price. Likewise, the price of Van Gogh paintings is unlikely to affect their supply.

Length and complexity of production
Much depends on the complexity of the production process. Textile production is relatively simple. The labour is largely unskilled and production facilities are little more than buildings – no special structures are needed. Thus the PES for textiles is elastic.

Mobility of factors
If the factors of production are easily available and if a producer producing one good can switch their resources and put it towards the creation of a product in demand, then it can be said that the PES is relatively elastic. The inverse applies to this, to make it relatively inelastic.

Time to respond
The more time a producer has to respond to price changes the more elastic the supply. Supply is normally more elastic in the long run than in the short run for produced goods, since it is generally assumed that in the long run all factors of production can be utilised to increase supply, whereas in the short run only labor can be increased, and even then, changes may be prohibitively costly. For example, a cotton farmer cannot immediately (i.e. in the short run) respond to an increase in the price of soybeans because of the time it would take to procure the necessary land.

Inventories
A producer who has a supply of goods or available storage capacity can quickly increase supply to market.

Spare or excess production capacity
A producer who has unused capacity can (and will) quickly respond to price changes in his market assuming that variable factors are readily available. The existence of spare capacity within a firm, would be indicative of more proportionate response in quantity supplied to changes in price (hence suggesting price elasticity). It indicates that the producer would be able to utilise spare factor markets (factors of production) at its disposal and hence respond to changes in demand to match with supply. The greater the extent of spare production capacity, the quicker suppliers can respond to price changes and hence the more price elastic the good/service would be.

== Elasticity versus slope ==
The elasticity of supply will generally vary along the curve, even if supply is linear so the slope is constant. This is because the slope measures the absolute increase in quantity for an absolute increase in price, but the elasticity measures the percentage change. This also means that the slope depends on the units of measurement and will change if the units change (e.g., dollars per pound versus dollars per ounce) while the elasticity is a simple number, independent of the units (e.g., 1.2). This is a major advantage of elasticities.

The slope of the supply curve is dP/dQ, while the elasticity is (dQ/dP)(P/Q). Thus, a supply curve with steeper slope (bigger dP/dQ and thus smaller dQ/dP) is less elastic, for given P and Q. Along a linear supply curve such as Q = a + b P the slope is constant (at 1/b) but the elasticity is b(P/Q), so the elasticity rises with greater P both from the direct effect and the increase in Q(P).

Another special feature of the linear supply curve arises because its elasticity can also be written as bP/(a + bP), which is less than 1 if a < 0 and greater than 1 if a > 0. Linear supply curves which cut through the positive part of the price axis and have zero quantity supplied if the price is too low (P < -a/b) have a < 0 and hence they always have elastic supply. Curves which cut through the positive part of the quantity axis and have positive quantity supplied (Q = a) even if the price is zero have a > 0 and hence always have inelastic supply. Curves which go through the origin have a = 0 and hence have an elasticity of 1.

When looking at the price elasticity of supply, there are five types. The five types are perfectly inelastic supply, relatively inelastic supply, unit elastic supply, relatively elastic supply, and perfectly elastic supply. These five types help to show how different products supply quantity changes when faced with changed in price.

Perfectly inelastic supply: This is when the E_{s} formula equals to zero, meaning that there is no change in the supply when there are price changes. This can be the case where there is a limited quantity of supply, for example, if there is only 200 of a certain product made and there will never be any more made, there will be no increase or decrease in the quantity of supply.

Relatively inelastic supply: This is when the E_{s} formula gives a result between zero and one, meaning that when there is a change in price, the percentage change in supply is lower than the percentage change in price. For example, if a product costs $1 and then increases to $1.10 the increase in price is 10% and therefore the change in supply will be less than 10%.

Unit Elastic supply: This is when the E_{s} formula equals to one, meaning that quantity supplied and price change by the same percentage. Using the previous example to show unit elasticity, when there is a 10% increase in price, there will also be a 10% increase in quantity supplied.

Relatively elastic supply: This is when the E_{s} formula gives a result above one, meaning that when there is a change in price, the percentage change in supply is higher than the percentage change in price. Using the above example to show an elastic supply, when there is a 10% increase in price there will be more than a 10% increase in supply.

Perfectly elastic supply: This is when the E_{s} formula actually gives an infinite result, meaning that the quantity that can be supplied is infinite, however, that is only at a specific price and if the price changes there will be no quantity supplied at all. For example, there may be an infinite supply of product at a price of $1 but if that price changes to $1.10 then the supply becomes zero.

== Short-run and long-run ==
Since firms typically have a limited capacity for production, the elasticity of supply tends to be high at low levels of quantity supplied and low at high levels of quantity supplied. At low levels of quantity supplied, firms typically have substantial capacity available for use, so small increases in price make it profitable for firms to begin to use this idle capacity. Thus, the responsiveness of quantity supplied to changes in price is high in this region of the supply curve. However, as capacity becomes fully utilised, increasing production requires additional investment in capital (for example, plant and equipment). Since the price must rise substantially to cover this additional expense, supply becomes less elastic at high levels of output.

== Selected supply elasticities ==
- Heating Oil: 1.58 (Short run)
- Gasoline: 1.61 (Short run)
- Tobacco: 7.0 (Long run)
- Housing: 1.6–3.7 (Long run)
- Cotton
  - 0.3 (Short run)
  - 1.0 (Long run)
- Steel: 1.2 (Long run, from Minimills)
- Land: 0, except when land reclamation is taking place
- Labour: 0.7-1.8

== See also ==
- Price elasticity of demand
- Cross elasticity of demand
