= Tax buoyancy =

Buoyancy coefficient of income tax in India during 1997-98 to 2007-08 (Source:Compiled from reports of Comptroller and Auditor General of India for relevant years)

Tax buoyancy is an indicator to measure efficiency and responsiveness of revenue mobilization in response to growth in the Gross domestic product or National income.

A tax is said to be buoyant if the tax revenues increase more than proportionately in response to a rise in national income or output.

Usually, tax elasticity is considered a better indicator to measure tax responsiveness.

== See also ==
- Elasticity (economics)
