= Elastic =

Elastic is a word often used to describe or identify certain types of elastomer, elastic used in garments or stretchable fabrics.

Elastic may also refer to:

== Alternative name ==
- Rubber band, ring-shaped band of rubber used to hold objects together
- Bungee cord, a cord composed of an elastic core covered in a sheath
- Chinese jump rope, a children's game resembling hopscotch and jump rope

== As a proper name ==
- Elastic (album), a 2002 album by jazz saxophonist Joshua Redman
- "Elastic", a 2018 single by Joey Purp
- Elastic, working title of the 2012 Indian film Cocktail
- Elastic, the company that releases the Elasticsearch search engine
  - Elasticsearch, a search engine based on Apache Lucene
- Amazon Elastic Compute Cloud (Amazon EC2), a web service that provides secure, resizable compute capacity in a cloud format
- Elastics (orthodontics), rubber bands used in orthodontics

== See also ==
- Elastic collision, a collision where kinetic energy is conserved
- Elastic deformation, reversible deformation of a material
- Elasticity (disambiguation)
- Flex (disambiguation)
- Stretch (disambiguation)
