= Elasticity of a function =

Mathematical definition of point elasticity

In mathematics, the elasticity or point elasticity of a positive differentiable function f of a positive variable (positive input, positive output) at point a is defined as

$$Ef(a) = \frac{a}{f(a)}f'(a)$$
$$=\lim_{x\to a}\frac{f(x)-f(a)}{x-a}\frac{a}{f(a)}=\lim_{x\to a}\frac{f(x)-f(a)}{f(a)}\frac{a}{x-a}=\lim_{x\to a}\frac{\frac{f(x)}{f(a)}-1}{\frac{x}{a}-1}\approx \frac{\%\Delta f(a)}{\%\Delta a}$$

or equivalently

$$Ef(x) = \frac{d \log f(x)}{d \log x}.$$

It is thus the ratio of the relative (percentage) change in the function's output $f(x)$ with respect to the relative change in its input $x$, for infinitesimal changes from a point $(a, f(a))$. Equivalently, it is the ratio of the infinitesimal change of the logarithm of a function with respect to the infinitesimal change of the logarithm of the argument. Generalizations to multi-input–multi-output cases also exist in the literature.

The elasticity of a function is a constant $\alpha$ if and only if the function has the form $f(x) = C x ^ \alpha$ for a constant $C>0$.

The elasticity at a point is the limit of the arc elasticity between two points as the separation between those two points approaches zero.

The concept of elasticity is widely used in economics and metabolic control analysis (MCA); see elasticity (economics) and elasticity coefficient respectively for details.

== Rules ==
Rules for finding the elasticity of products and quotients are simpler than those for derivatives. Let f, g be differentiable. Then

$$E ( f(x) \cdot g(x) ) = E f(x) + E g(x)$$
$$E \frac{f(x)}{g(x)} = E f(x) - E g(x)$$
$$E ( f(x) + g(x) ) = \frac{f(x) \cdot E(f(x)) + g(x) \cdot E(g(x))}{f(x) + g(x)}$$
$$E ( f(x) - g(x) ) = \frac{f(x) \cdot E(f(x)) - g(x) \cdot E(g(x))}{f(x) - g(x)}$$

The derivative can be expressed in terms of elasticity as

$$D f(x) = \frac{E f(x) \cdot f(x)}{x}$$

Let a and b be constants. Then

$$E ( a ) = 0, \$$
$$E ( x ) = 1, \$$
$$E ( a \cdot f(x) ) = E f(x),$$
$$E ( f(x)^b ) = b\cdot E f(x),$$
$$E (a x^b) = b. \$$

== Estimating point elasticities ==
In economics, the price elasticity of demand refers to the elasticity of a demand function Q(P), and can be expressed as (dQ/dP)/(Q(P)/P) or the ratio of the value of the marginal function (dQ/dP) to the value of the average function (Q(P)/P). This relationship provides an easy way of determining whether a demand curve is elastic or inelastic at a particular point. First, suppose one follows the usual convention in mathematics of plotting the independent variable (P) horizontally and the dependent variable (Q) vertically. Then the slope of a line tangent to the curve at that point is the value of the marginal function at that point. The slope of a ray drawn from the origin through the point is the value of the average function. If the absolute value of the slope of the tangent is greater than the slope of the ray then the function is elastic at the point; if the slope of the secant is greater than the absolute value of the slope of the tangent then the curve is inelastic at the point. If the tangent line is extended to the horizontal axis the problem is simply a matter of comparing angles created by the lines and the horizontal axis. If the marginal angle is greater than the average angle then the function is elastic at the point; if the marginal angle is less than the average angle then the function is inelastic at that point. If, however, one follows the convention adopted by economists and plots the independent variable P on the vertical axis and the dependent variable Q on the horizontal axis, then the opposite rules would apply.

The same graphical procedure can also be applied to a supply function or other functions.

== Semi-elasticity ==
A semi-elasticity (or semielasticity) gives the percentage change in f(x) in terms of a change (not percentage-wise) in x. Algebraically, the semi-elasticity S of a function f at point x is

$$Sf(x) = \frac{1}{f(x)}f'(x) = \frac{d \ln f(x)}{d x}$$

The semi-elasticity will be constant for exponential functions of the form, $f(x) = C \alpha^x$ since,

$$\ln{f} = \ln{C\alpha^x} = \ln{C} + x \ln{\alpha} \implies \frac{d \ln{f}}{d x} = \ln{\alpha}.$$

An example of semi-elasticity is modified duration in bond trading.

The opposite definition is sometimes used in the literature. That is, the term "semi-elasticity" is also sometimes used for the change (not percentage-wise) in f(x) in terms of a percentage change in x which would be

$$\frac{d f(x)}{d\ln(x)}=\frac{d f(x)}{dx}x$$

== See also ==
- Arc elasticity
- Elasticity (economics)
- Elasticity coefficient (biochemistry)
- Isoelastic function
- Homogeneous function
- Logarithmic derivative
