= Cellophane paradox =

Type of incorrect reasoning used in market regulation methods

The Cellophane paradox (also the Cellophane trap or Cellophane fallacy or gingerbread paradox) describes a type of incorrect reasoning used in market regulation methods.

The paradox is that a firm is seen not to have a monopoly because there are substitutes for its product, but the only reason there are substitutes is because the firm's monopoly power allows it to set a price high enough that substitutes are marketable. In technical economic terms, such a product has low cross-price elasticity of demand. A well-known example of the paradox involves the cellophane product in the 1950s, a United States Supreme Court case and subsequent response in economic literature.

Cellophane was a flexible wrapping material made by Du Pont, U.S. production of which Du Pont restricted to itself in the early 1950s using numerous patents. Du Pont was sued under the Sherman Act for monopolization of the cellophane market by the U.S. Justice Department, and the case (U.S. v. E. I. du Pont) was decided by the Supreme Court in 1956. The Court found no monopoly, because there were many substitutes for cellophane and, therefore, du Pont had only a small share of the market for wrapping materials (i.e., it possessed little or no market power).

This reasoning was challenged by a 1955 article in the American Economic Review, noting that the only reason substitutes for cellophane were available was that Du Pont had exercised excessive market power to command a high price for cellophane. In research on the du Pont company arising from his PhD dissertation, Willard F. Mueller and co-author George W. Stocking, Sr. pointed out the error of mistaking a monopolist's inability to exercise market power by raising price above the current price for an inability to have already exercised market power by raising price significantly above the competitive price. Courts that use a monopolized product's elevated market price will typically misconstrue a completed anti-competitive act as a lack of market power. Had the Supreme Court considered the substitutability of other wrappings at cellophane's competitive price, the sales of other wrappings would have been much lower; du Pont might very well have been found guilty of monopolizing the market for flexible wrappings.

As Richard Posner wrote, "Reasonable interchangeability at the current price but not at a competitive price level, far from demonstrating the absence of monopoly power, might well be a symptom of that power; this elementary point was completely overlooked by the court."

The problem continues to bedevil efforts by antitrust agencies to define markets. Defining markets by cross-elasticity of demand requires a reference price: If I raise my price by 5% from some base level, will people switch to a competing good? The problem is that a firm that actually does have a monopoly power still faces constraints on its ability to charge whatever price it wants; those constraints are set by consumers’ willingness to pay. If a monopolist already charges the profit-maximizing price, an increase above that price will cause consumers to stop buying the product; that's why the lower price was already profit-maximizing. So we can't just use the price a company already charges as the base level, or we will conclude that even monopolists lack market power.

Antitrust can solve this problem by using some measure of average cost, not the actual market price, as the baseline for the question whether a merger would allow the merged firm to increase price. But that means that the relevant question is not whether consumers would pay more for a can of Coke or a Harry Potter novel than they currently do; it is whether they would pay 5% more for the can of Coke than it cost to make, deliver, and sell it.
