= Elasticity (data store) =

The elasticity of a data store relates to the flexibility of its data model and clustering capabilities. The greater the number of data model changes that can be tolerated, and the more easily the clustering can be managed, the more elastic the data store is considered to be.

== Types ==
=== Clustering elasticity ===
Clustering elasticity is the ease of adding or removing nodes from the distributed data store. Usually, this is a difficult and delicate task to be done by an expert in a relational database system. Some NoSQL data stores, like Apache Cassandra have an easy solution, and a node can be added/removed with a few changes in the properties and by adding specifying at least one seed.

=== Data-modelling elasticity ===
Relational databases are most often very inelastic, as they have a predefined data model that can only be adapted through redesign. Most NoSQL data stores, however, do not have a fixed schema. Each row can have a different number and even different type of columns. Concerning the data store, modifications in the schema are no problem. This makes this kind of data stores more elastic concerning the data model. The drawback is that the programmer has to take into account that the data model may change over time.

== See also ==
- Apache Cassandra
- Oracle NoSQL Database
- Data store
