= Principles of Economics (Marshall book) =

1890 economics textbook

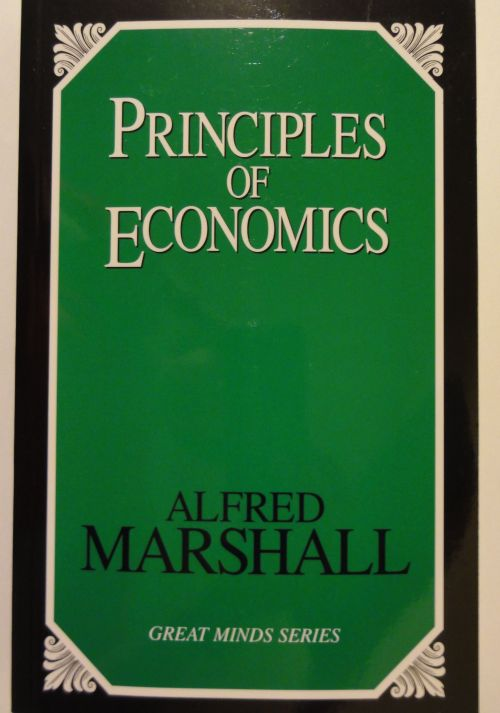
- Alfred Marshall, Principles of Economics, Great Minds Series, Year 1890.
- Author: Alfred Marshall
- Language: English
- Subject: Economics
- Publication date: 1890
- Publication place: United Kingdom

Principles of Economics is a leading political economy or economics textbook of Alfred Marshall, first published in 1890. It was the standard text for generations of economics students. Called his magnum opus, it ran to eight editions by 1920. A ninth (variorum) edition was published in 1961, edited in 2 volumes by C. W. Guillebaud.

== Writing ==
Marshall began writing the Principles of Economics in 1881 and he spent much of the next decade at work on the treatise. His plan for the work gradually extended to a two-volume compilation on the whole of economic thought; the first volume was published in 1890 to worldwide acclaim that established him as one of the leading economists of his time. The second volume, which was to address foreign trade, money, trade fluctuations, taxation, and collectivism, was never published at all. Over the next two decades he worked to complete his second volume of the Principles, but his unyielding attention to detail and ambition for completeness prevented him from mastering the work's breadth.

== Contents ==
- Preface

=== Book I. Preliminary Survey. ===
- I Introduction.
- II The Substance of Economics.
- III Economic Generalizations or Laws.
- IV The Order and Aims of Economic Studies.

=== Book II. Some Fundamental Notions. ===
- I Introductory.
- II Wealth.
- III Production. Consumption. Labour. Necessaries.
- IV Income. Capital.

=== Book III. On Wants and Their Satisfaction. ===
- I Introductory.
- II Wants In Relation To Activities.
- III Gradations Of Consumers' Demand.
- IV The Elasticity of Wants.
- V Choice Between Different Uses of the Same Thing. Immediate and Deferred Uses.
- VI Value and Utility.

=== Book IV. The Agents of Production. Land, Labour, Capital and Organization. ===
- I Introductory.
- II The Fertility of Land.
- III The Fertility of Land, Continued. The Tendency To Diminishing Return.
- IV The Growth of Population.
- V The Health and Strength of the Population.
- VI Industrial Training.
- VII The Growth of Wealth.
- VIII Industrial Organization.
- IX Industrial Organization, Continued. Division of Labour. The Influence of Machinery.
- X Industrial Organization, Continued. The Concentration of Specialized Industries in Particular Localities.
- XI Industrial Organization, Continued. Production on a Large Scale.
- XII Industrial Organization, Continued. Business Management.
- XIII Conclusion. Correlation of the Tendencies To Increasing and To Diminishing Return.

=== Book V. General Relations of Demand, Supply, and Value. ===
- I Introductory. On Markets.
- II Temporary Equilibrium of Demand and Supply.
- III Equilibrium of Normal Demand and Supply.
- IV The Investment and Distribution of Resources.
- V Equilibrium of Normal Demand and Supply, Continued, With Reference To Long and Short Periods.
- VI Joint and Composite Demand. Joint and Composite Supply.
- VII Prime and Total Cost in Relation To Joint Products. Cost of Marketing. Insurance Against Risk. Cost of Reproduction.
- VIII Marginal Costs in Relation To Values. General Principles.
- IX Marginal Costs in Relation To Values. General Principles, Continued.
- X Marginal Costs in Relation To Agricultural Values.
- XI Marginal Costs in Relation To Urban Values.
- XII Equilibrium of Normal Demand and Supply, Continued, With Reference To the Law of Increasing Return.
- XIII Theory of Changes of Normal Demand and Supply in Relation To the Doctrine of Maximum Satisfaction.
- XIV The Theory of Monopolies.
- XV Summary of the General Theory of Equilibrium of Demand and Supply

=== Book VI. The Distribution of National Income. ===
- I Preliminary Survey of Distribution.
- II Preliminary Survey of Distribution, Continued.
- III Earnings of Labour.
- IV Earnings of Labour, Continued.
- V Earnings of Labour, Continued.
- VI Interest of Capital.
- VII Profits of Capital and Business Power.
- VIII Profits of Capital and Business Power, Continued.
- IX Rent of Land.
- X Land Tenure.
- XI General View of Distribution. Marshall summarises how wealth is distributed through society.

"The efficiency as compared with the cost of almost every class of labour, is thus continually being weighed in the balance in one or more branches of production against some other classes of labour: and each of these in its turn against others. This competition is primarily "vertical": it is a struggle for the field of employment between groups of labour belonging to different grades, but engaged in the same branch of production, and inclosed, as it were, between the same vertical walls. But meanwhile "horizontal" competition is always at work, and by simpler methods: for, firstly, there is great freedom of movement of adults from one business to another within each trade; and secondly, parents can generally introduce their children into almost any other trade of the same grade with their own in their neighbourhood. By means of this combined vertical and horizontal competition there is an effective and closely adjusted balance of payments to services as between labour in different grades; in spite of the fact that the labour in any one grade is mostly recruited even now from the children of those in the same grade. The working of the principle of substitution is thus chiefly indirect. When two tanks containing fluid are joined by a pipe, the fluid, which is near the pipe in the tank with the higher level, will flow into the other, even though it be rather viscous; and thus the general levels of the tanks will tend to be brought together, though no fluid may flow from the further end of the one to the further end of the other; and if several tanks are connected by pipes, the fluid in all will tend to the same level, though some tanks have no direct connection with others. And similarly the principle of substitution is constantly tending by indirect routes to apportion earnings to efficiency between trades, and even between grades, which are not directly in contact with one another, and which appear at first sight to have no way of competing with one another." - VI.XI.6-7

- XII General Influences of Economic Progress. Marshall discusses the causes of economic development.

"But after all the chief cause of the modern prosperity of new countries lies in the markets that the old world offers, not for goods delivered on the spot, but for promises to deliver goods at a distant date." - VI.XII.3

"The key-notes of the modern movement are the reduction of a great number of tasks to one pattern; the diminution of friction of every kind which might hinder powerful agencies from combining their action and spreading their influence over vast areas; and the development of transport by new methods and new forces. The macadamized roads and the improved shipping of the eighteenth century broke up local combinations and monopolies, and offered facilities for the growth of others extending over a wider area: and in our own age the same double tendency is resulting from every new extension and cheapening of communication by land and sea, by printing-press and telegraph and telephone." - VI.XII.10

- XIII Progress in Relation To Standards of Life.

=== Appendices. ===
- Appendix A The Growth of Free Industry and Enterprise.
- Appendix B The Growth of Economic Science.
- Appendix C The Scope and Method of Economics.
- Appendix D Uses of Abstract Reasoning in Economics.
- Appendix E Definitions of Capital.
- Appendix F Barter.
- Appendix G The Incidence of Local Rates, With Some Suggestions As To Policy.
- Appendix H Limitations of the Use of Statical Assumptions in Regard To Increasing Return.
- Appendix I Ricardo's Theory of Value.
- Appendix J The Doctrine of the Wages-Fund.
- Appendix K Certain Kinds of Surplus.
- Appendix L Ricardo's Doctrine As To Taxes and Improvements in Agriculture.

== Contribution ==
Marshall's influence on modifying economic thought is difficult to deny. He popularized the use of supply and demand functions as tools of price determination (previously discovered independently by Cournot); modern economists owe the linkage between price shifts and curve shifts to Marshall. Marshall was an important part of the "marginalist revolution;" the idea that consumers attempt to adjust consumption until marginal utility equals the price was another of his contributions. The price elasticity of demand was presented by Marshall as an extension of these ideas. Economic welfare, divided into producer surplus and consumer surplus, was contributed by Marshall, and indeed, the two are sometimes described eponymously as 'Marshallian surplus.' He used this idea of surplus to rigorously analyze the effect of taxes and price shifts on market welfare. Marshall also identified quasi-rents.

== See also ==
- Economics, a similarly influential later textbook by Paul A. Samuelson.
- History of economic thought.
