= Yield elasticity of bond value =

Function of the Bond Market

The yield elasticity of bond value is the elasticity of the market value of a bond with respect to its yield—the percentage change in bond value divided by its causative percent change in the yield to maturity of the bond. Equivalently, it is the derivative of value with respect to yield times the (interest rate/value). This is equal to the Macaulay duration times the discount rate, or the modified duration times the interest rate.

If the elasticity is below -1, or above 1 if the absolute value is used, the product of the two measures, value times yield or the interest income for the period will go down when the yield goes up.
