= Isoelastic function =

In mathematical economics, an isoelastic function, sometimes constant elasticity function, is a function that exhibits a constant elasticity, i.e. has a constant elasticity coefficient. The elasticity is the ratio of the percentage change in the dependent variable to the percentage causative change in the independent variable, in the limit as the changes approach zero in magnitude.

For an elasticity coefficient $r$ (which can take on any real value), the function's general form is given by

$$f(x) = {k x^r},$$

where $k$ and $r$ are constants. The elasticity is by definition

$$\text {elasticity} = \frac {d f(x)}{dx} \frac {x}{f(x)} = \frac {d \text{ln} f(x)}{d \text{ln} x},$$

which for this function simply equals r.

== Derivation ==
Elasticity of demand is indicated by

${r} = \frac {dQ}{dP} \frac {P}{Q}$,

where r is the elasticity, Q is quantity, and P is price.

Rearranging gets us:

$\frac {r}{P}{dP} = \frac {1}{Q}{dQ}$

Then integrating

$\int\frac {r}{P}{dP} =\int \frac {1}{Q}{dQ}$

$r \ln(P) + C = \ln(Q)$

Simplify

$e^{\ln(P)r+C} = e^{ln(Q)}$

$(e^{\ln(P)})^re^C = Q$

$kP^r = Q$

$Q(P) = kP^r$

== Examples ==
=== Demand functions ===
An example in microeconomics is the constant elasticity demand function, in which p is the price of a product and D(p) is the resulting quantity demanded by consumers. For most goods the elasticity r (the responsiveness of quantity demanded to price) is negative, so it can be convenient to write the constant elasticity demand function with a negative sign on the exponent, in order for the coefficient $r$ to take on a positive value:

$$D(p) = {k p^{-r}},$$

where $r>0$ is now interpreted as the unsigned magnitude of the responsiveness. An analogous function exists for the supply curve.

=== Utility functions in the presence of risk ===
The constant elasticity function is also used in the theory of choice under risk aversion, which usually assumes that risk-averse decision-makers maximize the expected value of a concave von Neumann-Morgenstern utility function. In this context, with a constant elasticity of utility with respect to, say, wealth, optimal decisions on such things as shares of stocks in a portfolio are independent of the scale of the decision-maker's wealth. The constant elasticity utility function in this context is generally written as

$$U(x) = \frac{1}{1 - \gamma}x^{1 - \gamma}$$

where x is wealth and $1 - \gamma$ is the elasticity, with $\gamma > 0$ , $\gamma$ ≠ 1 referred to as the constant coefficient of relative risk aversion (with risk aversion approaching infinity as $\gamma$ → ∞).

== See also ==
- Constant elasticity of substitution
- Power function
