= Arc elasticity =

Elasticity of one variable with respect to another between two given points

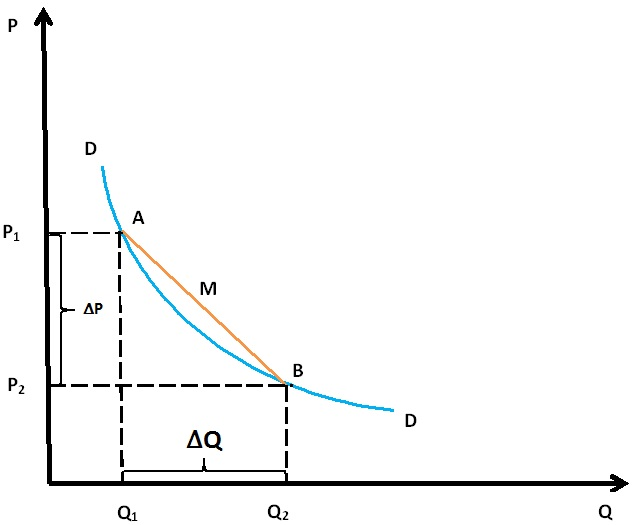
A chart to illustrate the arc elasticity of demand

In mathematics and economics, the arc elasticity is the elasticity of one variable with respect to another between two given points. It is the ratio of the percentage change of one of the variables between the two points to the percentage change of the other variable. It contrasts with the point elasticity, which is the limit of the arc elasticity as the distance between the two points approaches zero and which hence is defined at a single point rather than for a pair of points.

== Formula ==
The y arc elasticity of x is defined as:

$$E_{x,y} = \frac{\% \mbox{ change in } x}{\% \mbox{ change in } y}$$

where the percentage change in going from point 1 to point 2 is usually calculated relative to the midpoint:

$$\% \mbox{ change in } x = \frac{x_2 - x_1}{(x_2 + x_1)/2};$$

$$\% \mbox{ change in } y = \frac{y_2 - y_1}{(y_2 + y_1)/2}.$$

The use of the midpoint arc elasticity formula (with the midpoint used for the base of the change, rather than the initial point (x_{1}, y_{1}) which is used in almost all other contexts for calculating percentages) was advocated by R. G. D. Allen for use when x refers to the quantity of a good demanded or supplied and y refers to its price, due to the following properties: (1) it is symmetric with respect to the two prices and quantities, (2) it is independent of the units of measurement, and (3) it yields a value of unity if the total revenues (price times quantity) at the two points are equal.

The arc elasticity is used when there is not a general function for the relationship of two variables, but two points on the relationship are known. In contrast, calculation of the point elasticity requires detailed knowledge of the functional relationship and can be calculated wherever the function is defined.

For comparison, the y point elasticity of x is given by

$$E_{x,y} = \frac{\partial x}{\partial y} \cdot \frac{y}{x} = \frac{\partial \ln x}{\partial \ln y}$$

== Application in economics ==
The arc elasticity of quantity demanded (or quantity supplied) Q with respect to price P, also known as the arc price elasticity of demand (or supply), is calculated as

$$(\% \mbox{ change in }Q)/(\%\mbox{ change in }P)$$

=== Example ===
Suppose that two points on a demand curve, $(Q_1, P_1)$ and $(Q_2, P_2)$, are known. (Nothing else might be known about the demand curve.) Then the arc elasticity is obtained using the formula

$$E_p =\frac{\frac{Q_2-Q_1}{(Q_1+Q_2)/2}}{\frac{P_2-P_1}{(P_1+P_2)/2}}.$$

Suppose the quantity of hot dogs demanded at halftime of football games is measured at two different games at which two different prices are charged: at one measurement the quantity demanded is 80 units, and at the other measurement it is 120 units. The percent change, measured against the average, would be (120-80)/((120+80)/2))=40%. If the measurements were taken in reverse sequence (first 120 and then 80), the absolute value of the percentage change would be the same.

In contrast, if the percentage change in quantity demanded were measured against the initial value, the calculated percentage change would be (120-80)/80= 50%. The percent change for the reverse sequence of observations, 120 units to 80 units, would be (80-120)/120 = -33.3%. The midpoint formula has the benefit that a percentage change from A to B is measured in absolute value as the same as one from B to A.

Suppose that the change in the price of hot dogs, which led to this change in quantity demanded from 80 to 120, was from $3 to $1. The percent change in price measured against the midpoint would be (1-3)/2 = -100%, so the price elasticity of demand is 40%/(-100%) or -0.4. It is common to refer to the absolute value of the price elasticity as simply price elasticity, since for a normal (decreasing) demand curve the elasticity is always negative and so the "minus" part can be made implicit. Thus the arc price elasticity demand of the football fans is 0.4. For comparison, the point elasticity is 50%/(-66.6%) = 0.75.

== See also ==
- Elasticity of a function
- Elasticity (economics)
