= Modelnomics =

An economic assessment of the highly controversial issue of body image within the global fashion industry, along the lines of Alfred Marshall's supply-demand model.

"Modelnomics" illustrates the tendency for models to gain value by way of salary, from marked losses in weight.

The term was first used by fashion writer Lottie Ntim, to illustrate the tradeoff between a model's self-worth and their food intake, following apparent industry aversion to model Coco Rocha's weight gain and a call on the Council of Fashion Designers of America(CFDA) to revise the model sample size.

== Graphical Representation ==
Given the competitive nature of the global fashion industry, particularly in relation to model size, price or value of models is ultimately determined by an equalization of food intake required for said models' survival and food intake required to remain a viable competitor in the modeling industry. This of course assumes the economic principle of ceteris paribus or, all else being equal, such that the implications of a model's health, metabolism or access to food are considered irrelevant or negligible. The effects of factors such as income may be illustrated via a shift in curves.

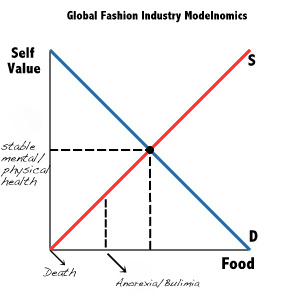

The supply curve represents the amount of food intake that industry professionals would permit a model to consume in order to maintain a certain value, ceteris paribus.

The demand curve represents the amount of food that models are willing and able to eat in relation to a target value or pay rate, ceteris paribus. Following the law of demand, the demand curve is downward-sloping, meaning that a model's worth decreases as they eat more food.
