= AP Economics =

Advanced Placement (AP) Economics (also known as AP Econ) refers to two College Board Advanced Placement Program courses and exams addressing various aspects of the field of economics:

- AP Macroeconomics
- AP Microeconomics
