= AP Macroeconomics =

Advanced Placement high school macroeconomics course

Advanced Placement (AP) Macroeconomics (also known as AP Macro and AP Macroecon) is an Advanced Placement macroeconomics course for high school students that culminates in an exam offered by the College Board.

Study begins with fundamental economic concepts such as scarcity, opportunity costs, production possibilities, specialization, comparative advantage, demand, supply, and price determination.

Major topics include measurement of economic performance, national income and price determination, fiscal and monetary policy, and international economics and growth. AP Macroeconomics is frequently taught in conjunction with (and, in some cases, in the same year as) AP Microeconomics as part of a comprehensive AP Economics curriculum, although more students take the former.

== Topic outline ==
#	Topic	Exam Weighting
Unit 1	Basic Economic Concepts	5-10%
Unit 2	Economic Indicators and the Business Cycle	12-17%
Unit 3	National Income and Price Determination	17-27%
Unit 4	Financial Sector	18-23%
Unit 5	Long-Run Consequences of Stabilization Policies	20-30%
Unit 6	Open Economy - International Trade and Finance	10-13%

== Examination ==
Started in 2025, the AP Macroeconomics exam includes two sections: Multiple-Choice and Free-Response. The exam is a hybrid digital exam, which means that the contestants have to complete the Multiple-Choice section and view the Free-Response questions on the Bluebook testing application, and handwrite the Free-Response answers in paper exam booklets.

=== Multiple-Choice Section (66% of Score): 1 hour and 10 minutes ===
- 60 questions.
  - Each question has 5 answer choices.

=== Free-Response Section (33% of Score): 1 hour (with a 10-minute reading period) ===
- 3 questions.
  - 1 long-answer question (50% of the section score).
  - 2 short-answer questions (each worth 25% of the section score).
- Students will be asked to:
  - Make assertions about/Explain economic concepts, principles, models, outcomes and/or effect.
  - Draw graphs.
  - Perform numerical analysis.

== Score distribution ==
The exam was first held in 1989, along with Microeconomics. Grade distributions since 2015 are as follows:

Score	2015	2016	2017	2018	2019	2020	2021	2022	2023	2024	2025	2026
5	15.2%	17.4%	17.4%	19.7%	19.1%	19.7%	18.0%	16.4%	17.1%	16%	18%	19%
4	22.2%	23.4%	23.3%	22.6%	23.0%	25.0%	19.6%	20.0%	22.9%	21%	23%	22%
3	17.1%	16.1%	16.9%	16.2%	16.9%	18.5%	13.7%	15.4%	24.7%	25%	25%	25%
2	17.0%	17.0%	15.8%	16.8%	14.9%	16.2%	15.7%	15.1%	21.6%	23%	22%	20%
1	28.4%	26.0%	26.6%	24.7%	26.2%	20.5%	32.9%	33.1%	13.7%	15%	12%	14%
% of scores 3 or higher	54.6%	57.0%	57.6%	58.5%	58.9%	63.2%	51.3%	51.8%	64.7%	62%	66%	66%
Mean	2.79	2.89	2.89	2.96	2.94	3.07	2.74	2.71	3.08	3.00		
Standard deviation	1.45	1.46	1.46	1.47	1.48	1.42	1.52	1.50	1.29	1.30		
Number of Students	126,267	134,638	141,649	146,673	146,091	122,639	124,436	134,413	164,505	160,741	176,356	189,000

== Criticism ==
Tawni Ferrarini, James Gwartney, and John Morton have written that the examination does not adequately cover recent advances in the field: "The AP macroeconomics exam and resources largely reflect the simplistic Keynesian view from the 1960s and 1970s." The College Board updates the AP Macroeconomics curriculum with the guidance of college and high school economics instructors. The most recent update was published in 2022.

== See also ==
- Economics
- Economics education § Curriculum
- Glossary of economics

== Study Resources ==
- Anderson, David; Ray, Margaret (2019). Krugman's Economics for the AP Course (3rd ed.). New York: BFW. ISBN 978-1-319-11327-8.
