= Market demand schedule =

Tabulation of good quantity that will be purchased at a given price

In economics, a market demand schedule is a tabulation of the quantity of a good that all consumers in a market will purchase at a given price. At any given price, the corresponding value on the demand schedule is the sum of all consumers’ quantities demanded at that price.

Generally, there is an inverse relationship between the price and the quantity demanded. The graphical representation of a demand schedule is called a demand curve.

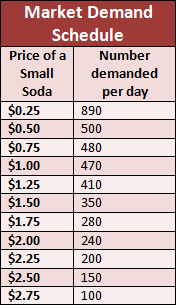
An example of a market demand schedule
