= Law of supply =

Economic theory principle

The law of supply is a fundamental principle of economic theory which states that, keeping other factors constant, an increase in price results in an increase in quantity supplied. In other words, there is a direct relationship between price and quantity: quantities respond in the same direction as price changes. This means that producers and manufacturers are willing to offer more of a product for sale on the market at higher prices, as increasing production is a way of increasing profits.

In short, the law of supply is a positive relationship between quantity supplied and price, and is the reason for the upward slope of the supply curve.

Some heterodox economists, such as Steve Keen and Dirk Ehnts, dispute the law of supply, arguing that the supply curve for mass-produced goods is often downward-sloping: as production increases, unit prices go down, and conversely, if demand is very low, unit prices go up.

== Definition ==
A supply is a good or service that producers are willing to provide. The law of supply determines the quantity of supply at a given price.

The law of supply and demand states that, for a given product, if the quantity demanded exceeds the quantity supplied, then the price increases, which decreases the demand (law of demand) and increases the supply (law of supply)—and vice versa—until the quantity supplied equals the quantity demanded.

For example, a job paying £20/hr attracts more interest than a job paying £15/hr, and a high interest rate attracts lenders and deters borrowers.

== Affecting factors ==
There are various non-price determinants that can cause a shift in a supply curve. For example, if the costs of production, such as wages, decrease, then the manufacturers can produce more goods for the same price, so the quantity supplied will increase. If the number of suppliers increases, or if the capacity of a factory producing the goods increases, the quantity supplied will increase.

Other factors can include government policy—government subsidies to encourage certain products decreases the overall cost of production. However, government taxation can cause the cost of production to rise. For some products, such as in agriculture, the quantity supplied is dependent on the weather.

== See also ==
- Demand curve
- Economies of scale
- Law of demand
- Supply (economics)
- Supply and demand
