= Product market =

In economics, the product market is the marketplace where final goods or services are sold to households and the foreign sector. Focusing on the sale of finished goods, it does not include trading in raw materials (commodities) or other intermediate materials.

Product market regulation is a term for the placing of restrictions upon the operation of the product market. According to an OECD ranking in 1998, English-speaking and Nordic countries had the least-regulated product markets in the OECD. The least-regulated product markets were to be found in:

1. United Kingdom
2. Australia
3. United States
4. Canada
5. New Zealand
6. Denmark
7. Ireland

According to the OECD, indicators for product market regulation include price controls, foreign ownership barriers, and tariffs, among other things.

== See also ==
- Factor market (economics)
- Product marketing
