= AP Microeconomics =

Advanced Placement course

Advanced Placement (AP) Microeconomics (also known as AP Micro and AP Microecon) is a course offered by the College Board as part of the Advanced Placement Program for high school students interested in college-level coursework in microeconomics and/or gaining advanced standing in college. The course begins with a study of fundamental economic concepts such as scarcity, opportunity costs, production possibilities, specialization, and comparative advantage. Major topics include the nature and functions of product markets; factor markets; and efficiency, equity, and the role of government. AP Microeconomics is often taken in conjunction with or after AP Macroeconomics.

== Topics outline and distribution of topics ==
Topics covered in the AP Microeconomics course and exam include:

Unit	Topic	Exam Weighting
1	Basic Economic Concepts (Scarcity, Resource allocation and economic systems, The Production Possibilities Curve, Comparative advantage and gains from trade, Cost-benefit analysis, Marginal analysis and consumer choice)	12–15%
2	Supply and Demand (Demand, Supply, Elasticity, Market equilibrium, disequilibrium, and changes in equilibrium, effects of government intervention in markets, International trade and public policy)	20–25%
3	Production, Cost, and the Perfect Competition Model (The production function, Short- and long-run production costs, Types of profit, Profit maximization, Perfect competition)	22–25%
4	Imperfect Competition (Monopoly, Price discrimination, Monopolistic competition, Oligopoly and game theory)	15–22%
5	Factor Markets (Introduction to factor markets, Changes in factor demand and factor supply, Profit-maximizing behavior in perfectly competitive factor markets, Monopsonistic markets)	10–13%
6	Market Failure and the Role of the Government (Socially efficient and inefficient market outcomes, Externalities, Public and private goods, The effects of government intervention in different market structures, Income and wealth inequality)	8–13%

== The exam ==
- Multiple Choice: Students are given 70 minutes to complete 60 multiple choice questions which are weighted 2/3 (66.7%) of the total exam score.
- Free-Response: Students are allotted 10 minutes of planning then 50 minutes of writing for one long free-response question (weighted 50% of section score) and two short ones (weighted 25% section score each).
- 2026 Exam Date: Monday, May 4, 12 PM Local.

== Score distribution ==
94,772 students took the AP Microeconomics exam in 2023.

The exam was first held in 1989, along with Macroeconomics. Grade distributions since 2015 are as follows:

Score	2015	2016	2017	2018	2019	2020	2021	2022	2023	2024	2025	2026
5	19.1%	17.8%	23.5%	19.2%	24.3%	23.3%	18.5%	17.7%	21.3%	22.9%	21.6%	19%
4	28.6%	27.5%	28.1%	28%	28.1%	29.0%	24.0%	22.5%	26.0%	23.9%	24%	26%
3	19.4%	22.0%	18.0%	20.2%	17.2%	16.6%	16.6%	18.8%	20.6%	20.8%	22.6%	23%
2	13.8%	13.7%	12.0%	15.8%	12.0%	14.2%	17.0%	16.9%	19.9%	19.2%	20.3%	20%
1	19.1%	19.0%	18.5%	16.8%	18.4%	16.9%	23.9%	24.2%	12.1%	13.2%	11.5%	12%
% of scores 3 or higher	67.1%	67.3%	69.5%	67.4%	69.6%	68.9%	59.1%	59.0%	68%	67.6%	68.2%	68%
Mean	3.15	3.11	3.26	3.17	3.28	3.28	2.96	2.93	3.25	3.24	3.24	
Standard deviation	1.39	1.37	1.42	1.36	1.42	1.40	1.45	1.44	1.32	1.35	1.31	
Number of Students	78,408	82,388	87,858	90,032	91,551	82,415	80,199	84,386	94,772	103,809	117,548	127,000

== See also ==
- AP Macroeconomics
- Microeconomics
- Economics
- Economics education § Curriculum
- Glossary of economics

== Study Resources ==
- Anderson, David; Ray, Margaret (2019). Krugman's Economics for the AP Course (3rd ed.). New York: BFW. ISBN 978-1-319-11327-8.
- Free online AP Microeconomics course taught by Prof. Jon Gruber (MIT): https://www.edx.org/course/introductory-ap-microeconomics
