= Feasibility condition =

The feasibility condition is a fundamental concept in microeconomics used in conjunction with the tangency condition to solve the consumer choice problem and derive the demand function. It ensures that a consumer’s total expenditure on goods does not exceed their available income, forming the basis of the budget constraint in consumer theory. The condition states that total spending on all goods cannot exceed available income. The general form of the feasibility condition for two goods is as follows:

$$xp_x+yp_y \leq I$$,

where x and y are the quantities consumed of the two goods, p_{x} and p_{y} are their respective prices, and I is the income of the consumer.

The feasibility condition ensures that consumers make financially sustainable choices, preventing their expenditures from exceeding their income. It provides a foundation for understanding consumer behavior, analyzing market demand, and solving optimization problems in economics.
