= Iron law of prohibition =

Drug enforcement leads to higher potency

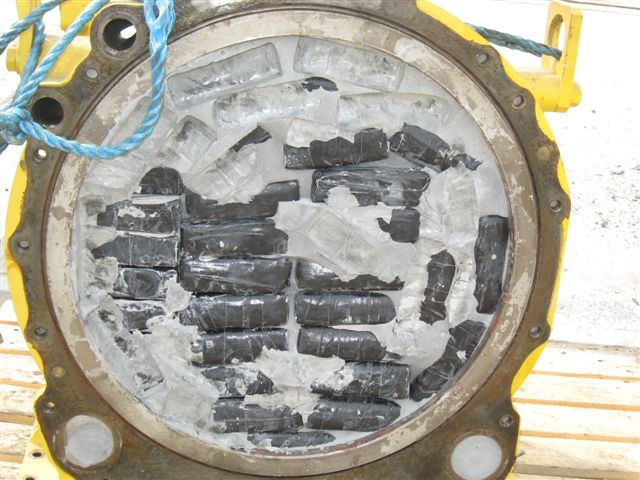
£8.25 million worth of cocaine hidden inside a machinery shipment.

The iron law of prohibition is a term coined by Richard Cowan in 1986 which posits that as law enforcement becomes more intense, the potency of prohibited substances increases. Cowan put it this way: "the harder the enforcement, the harder the drugs."

This law is an application of the Alchian–Allen effect; Libertarian judge Jim Gray calls the law the "cardinal rule of prohibition", and notes that is a powerful argument for the legalization of drugs. It is based on the premise that when drugs or alcohol are prohibited, they will be produced in black markets in more concentrated and powerful forms, because these more potent forms offer better efficiency in the business model—they take up less space in storage, less weight in transportation, and they sell for more money. Economist Mark Thornton writes that the iron law of prohibition undermines the argument in favor of prohibition, because the higher potency forms are less safe for the consumer.

== Findings ==
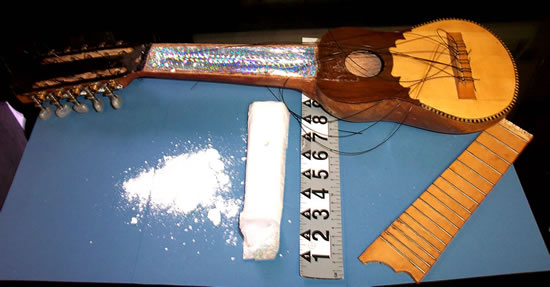
A charango used to smuggle cocaine.

Thornton published research showing that the potency of marijuana increased in response to higher enforcement budgets. He later expanded this research in his dissertation to include other illegal drugs and alcohol during Prohibition in the United States (1920–1933). The basic approach is based on the Alchian and Allen Theorem. This argument says that a fixed cost (e.g. transportation fee) added to the price of two varieties of the same product (e.g. high quality red apple and a low quality red apple) results in greater sales of the more expensive variety. When applied to rum-running, drug smuggling, and blockade running the more potent products become the sole focus of the suppliers. Thornton notes that the greatest added cost in illegal sales is the avoidance of detection. Thornton says that if drugs are legalized, then consumers will begin to wean themselves off the higher potency forms, for instance with cocaine users buying coca leaves, and heroin users switching to opium.

The popular shift from beer to wine to hard liquor during the US Prohibition era has a parallel in the narcotics trade in the late 20th century. Bulky opium was illegal, so refined heroin became more prevalent, albeit with significant risk from blood-borne disease because of injection by needle, and far greater risk of death from overdose. Marijuana was also found too bulky and troublesome to smuggle across borders, so smugglers turned to refined cocaine with its much higher potency and profit per pound. Cowan wrote in 1986 that crack cocaine was entirely a product of the prohibition of drugs. Clinical psychiatrist Michael J. Reznicek adds crystal meth to this list. In the 2010s the iron law has been invoked to explain why heroin is displaced by fentanyl and other, even stronger, synthetic opioids.

With underage drinking by teens in the U.S., one of the impacts of laws against possession of alcohol by minors is that teens tend to prefer distilled spirits, because they are easier to conceal than beer.

== Derivation ==
Consider the situation where there are two substitute goods $x_{H}$ and $x_{L}$, denoting the higher and lower quality goods with respective prices $p_{H}$ and $p_{L}$, and where $p_{H} > p_{L}$ i.e. the higher quality good has a higher price. Each of these goods has a compensated demand curve (a demand curve which holds utility constant) of the form
$$x_{i} = h_{i}(p_{H},p_{L},U), \quad i \in \{H,L\},$$
where
$$\left(h_{i}(p_{H},p_{L},U)\right)_{i \in \{H,L\}} = h(p_{H},p_{L},U)) = \underset{x \in \mathbb{R}_{+}^2 : \, u(x) \geq U}{\operatorname{arg \, min}} \, \sum_{i \in \{H,L\}} p_i x_i,$$
with $u(x)$ denoting the utility function of the consumer. Furthermore, we will also assume that income is held constant, as income effects are indeterminate in forecasting changes in demand.

Suppose that there is an associated cost $\tau$ that is added to each good due to transport costs. We want to know how the ratio of demand $x_{H}/x_{L}$ changes for the two goods based on $\tau$. Taking the derivative with respect to $\tau$ yields

$${\partial\over{\partial \tau}}\left( {x_{H}\over{x_{L}}} \right) = {1\over{x_{L}}}{\partial x_{H}\over{\partial \tau}} - {x_{H} \over{x_{L}^{2}}}{\partial x_{L}\over{\partial \tau}}.$$	1

From our assumptions, we have that the total price for each item is $p_{i} + \tau$. Therefore, we may compute $\partial x_{i}/\partial \tau$ to be
$${\partial x_{i}\over{\partial \tau}} = {\partial x_{i}\over{\partial p_{H}}} + {\partial x_{i}\over{\partial p_{L}}}, \quad i \in \{H,L \}.$$

We may now rewrite (1) as

$${\partial\over{\partial \tau}}\left( {x_{H}\over{x_{L}}} \right) = {x_{H}\over{x_{L}}} \left( \frac{1}{x_H}(\frac{\partial x_H}{\partial p_H} + \frac{\partial x_H}{\partial p_L}) - \frac{1}{x_L}(\frac{\partial x_L}{\partial p_H} + \frac{\partial x_L}{\partial p_L}) \right).$$	2

Finally, using the cross-elasticity of demand,
$$\epsilon_{ij} = {\partial x_{i}/x_{i}\over{\partial p_{j}/p_{j}}}, \quad i,j \in \{H,L\},$$
we arrive at the following expression of the derivative

$${\partial\over{\partial \tau}}\left( {x_{H}\over{x_{L}}} \right) = {x_{H}\over{x_{L}}} \left( {\epsilon_{HH}\over{p_{H}}} + {\epsilon_{HL}\over{p_{L}}} - {\epsilon_{LH}\over{p_{H}}} - {\epsilon_{LL}\over{p_{L}}} \right) = {x_{H}\over{x_{L}}} \left( {1\over{p_{H}}}(\epsilon_{HH} - \epsilon_{LH}) + {1\over{p_{L}}}(\epsilon_{HL} - \epsilon_{LL}) \right).$$	3

Now, we want to show that $\partial_{\tau}(x_{H}/x_{L}) > 0$, but seem to be stuck with elasticities that are indeterminate. However, Hicks' third law of demand gives us $\epsilon_{HH} = -\epsilon_{HL}$ and $\epsilon_{LH} = -\epsilon_{LL}$. To see why this is, suppose that we take a more general version of the compensated demand function with $n$ goods and compensated demand curves $h_{i}(p_{1},\dots,p_{n},U)$, for $i = 1,\dots,n$.

For a homogeneous function $f(z_{1},\dots,z_{n},V)$ of degree $m$, defined as
$$f(\lambda z_{1},\dots,\lambda z_{n},V) = \lambda^{m}f(z_{1},\dots,z_{n},V),$$
Euler's homogeneous function theorem states that
$$m f(z_{1},\dots,z_{n},V) = {\partial f\over{\partial z_{1}}}z_{1} + \cdots + {\partial f\over{\partial z_{n}}}z_{n}.$$

Compensated demand functions are homogeneous of degree 0, since multiplying all prices by a constant $\lambda > 0$ yields the same solution to the expenditure minimization problem as the original prices. Thus,
$$0 = {\partial x_{i}\over{\partial p_{1}}}p_{1} + \cdots + {\partial x_{i}\over{\partial p_{n}}}p_{n}, \quad i = 1,\dots,n .$$
Dividing by the stock $x_{i}$ yields
$$0 = {\partial x_{i}\over{\partial p_{1}}}{p_{1}\over{x_{i}}} + \cdots + {\partial x_{i}\over{\partial p_{n}}}{p_{n}\over{x_{i}}} = \sum_{j=1}^{n}\epsilon_{ij}, \quad i = 1,\dots,n,$$
which establishes Hicks' third law of demand.

Using Hicks' law, (3) is rewritten as

$${\partial\over{\partial \tau}}\left( {x_{H}\over{x_{L}}} \right) = {x_{H}\over{x_{L}}} \left( -{1\over{p_{H}}}(\epsilon_{HL} + \epsilon_{LH}) + {1\over{p_{L}}}(\epsilon_{HL} + \epsilon_{LH}) \right).$$	4

Suppose for the sake of contradiction that $\frac{\partial}{\partial \tau}\left( \frac{x_H}{x_L} \right) \leq 0$. Then,
$$-{1\over{p_{H}}}(\epsilon_{HL} + \epsilon_{LH}) + {1\over{p_{L}}}(\epsilon_{HL} + \epsilon_{LH}) \leq 0 .$$
By initial assumption, our two goods are substitutes. As such, $\epsilon_{HL} > 0$ and $\epsilon_{LH} > 0$, implying that
$$-\frac{1}{p_H} + \frac{1}{p_L} \leq 0 \quad \Longleftrightarrow \quad p_L \geq p_H.$$
But, this contradicts the assumption that $p_H > p_L$. Thus, we conclude that $\frac{\partial}{\partial \tau}\left( \frac{x_H}{x_L} \right) > 0$. This implies that as the transport costs increase, the higher quality good will become more prevalent than the lower quality good. In the drug-specific context, as costs associated with drug enforcement increase, the more potent drug will become more prevalent in the illegal drug market.
