= Supply (economics) =

Amount of a good that sellers are willing to provide in the market

An example of a nonlinear supply curve

In economics, supply is the amount of a resource that firms, producers, labourers, providers of financial assets, or other economic agents are willing and able to provide to the marketplace or to an individual. Supply can be in produced goods, labour time, raw materials, or any other scarce or valuable object. Supply is often plotted graphically as a supply curve, with the price per unit on the vertical axis and quantity supplied as a function of price on the horizontal axis. This reversal of the usual position of the dependent variable and the independent variable is a standard convention.

The supply curve can be either for an individual seller or for the market as a whole, adding up the quantity supplied by all sellers. The quantity supplied is for a particular time period (e.g., the tons of steel a firm would supply in a year), but the units and time are often omitted in theoretical presentations.

In the goods market, supply is the amount of a product per unit of time that producers are willing to sell at various given prices when all other factors are held constant. In the labor market, the supply of labor is the amount of time per week, month, or year that individuals are willing to spend working, as a function of the wage rate.

In the economic and financial field, the money supply is the amount of highly liquid assets available in the money market, which is either determined or influenced by a country's monetary authority. This can vary based on which type of money supply one is discussing. M1 for example is commonly used to refer to narrow money, coins, cash, and other money equivalents that can be converted to currency nearly instantly. M2 by contrast includes all of M1 but also includes short-term deposits and certain types of market funds.

== Supply schedule ==
A supply schedule is a table which shows how much one or more firms will be willing to supply at particular prices under the existing circumstances. Some of the more important factors affecting supply are the good's own price, the prices of related goods, production costs, technology, the production function, and expectations of sellers.

=== Factors affecting supply ===
Innumerable factors and circumstances could affect a seller's willingness or ability to produce and sell a good. Some of the more common factors are:

Good's own price: The basic supply relationship is between the price of a good and the quantity supplied. According to the law of supply, keeping other factors constant, an increase in price results in an increase in quantity supplied.

Prices of related goods: For purposes of supply analysis related goods refer to goods from which inputs are derived to be used in the production of the primary good. For example, Spam is made from pork shoulders and ham. Both are derived from pigs. Therefore, pigs would be considered a related good to Spam. In this case the relationship would be negative or inverse. If the price of pigs goes up the supply of Spam would decrease (supply curve shifts left) because the cost of production would have increased. A related good may also be a good that can be produced with the firm's existing factors of production. For example, suppose that a firm produces leather belts, and that the firm's managers learn that leather pouches for smartphones are more profitable than belts. The firm might reduce its production of belts and begin production of cell phone pouches based on this information. Finally, a change in the price of a joint product will affect supply. For example, beef products and leather are joint products. If a company runs both a beef processing operation and a tannery an increase in the price of steaks would mean that more cattle are processed which would increase the supply of leather.

Conditions of production: The most significant factor here is the state of technology. If there is a technological advancement in one good's production, the supply increases. Other variables may also affect production conditions. For instance, for agricultural goods, weather is crucial for it may affect the production outputs. Economies of scale can also affect conditions of production.

Expectations: Sellers' concern for future market conditions can directly affect supply. If the seller believes that the demand for his product will sharply increase in the foreseeable future the firm owner may immediately increase production in anticipation of future price increases. The supply curve would shift out.

Price of inputs: Inputs include land, labor, energy and raw materials. If the price of inputs increases the supply curve will shift left as sellers are less willing or able to sell goods at any given price. For example, if the price of electricity increased a seller may reduce his supply of his product because of the increased costs of production. Fixed inputs can affect the price of inputs, and the scale of production can affect how much the fixed costs translate into the end price of the good.

Number of suppliers: The market supply curve is the horizontal summation of the individual supply curves. As more firms enter the industry, the market supply curve will shift out, driving down prices.

Government policies and regulations: Government intervention can have a significant effect on supply. Government intervention can take many forms including environmental and health regulations, hour and wage laws, taxes, electrical and natural gas rates and zoning and land use regulations.

This list is not exhaustive. All facts and circumstances that are relevant to a seller's willingness or ability to produce and sell goods can affect supply. For example, if the forecast is for snow retail sellers will respond by increasing their stocks of snow sleds or skis or winter clothing or bread and milk.

=== Cases that violate the law of supply/ Exceptional cases to the law of supply ===
Agricultural products / Perishable goods: Due to their nature of having a short shelf life, immediately after harvest they are offered in the market for sale in large quantities during which prices are usually low. During dry season / planting season, it is the opposite.

Commodities produced in fixed amounts: For example, some commodities which depend on the machine set up, in this case at different prices in the market the commodity may be offered in the same quantity.

Supply of labour in the market: The senior management/executive positions have high wages but work a few hours as compared to staff members who earn middle wage levels but work for the longest hours.

== Supply function and equation ==
Supply functions, then, may be classified according to the source from which they come: consumers or firms. Each type of supply function is now considered in turn. In so doing, the following notational conventions are employed: There are I produced goods, each defining a single industry, and J factors. The indices i = 1,..., I and J = 1,..., J run, respectively, over produced goods (industries) and factors. Let n index all goods by first listing produced goods and then factors so that n = 1,..., I, I + 1,..., I + J. The number of firms in industry i is written L i, and these firms are indexed by l = 1,..., L i. There are K consumers enumerated as k = 1,..., K. The variable $y_{I+jk}$represents the quantities of factor j consumed by consumer k. This person can have endowments of good j from $\bar{y}_{I+1k}$to $\bar{y}_{I+jk}$. If $y_{I+jk}$ < $\bar{y}_{I+jk}$then person k is a supplier of j. If the opposite is true, they are a consumer of j.

The supply function is the mathematical expression of the relationship between supply and those factors that affect the willingness and ability of a supplier to offer goods for sale. An example would be the curve implied by $Q_{\text{s}} = f(P;P_{\text{rg}})$ where $P$ is the price of the good and $P_{\text{rg}}$ is the price of a related good. The semicolon means that the variables to the right are held constant when quantity supplied is plotted against the good's own price. The supply equation is the explicit mathematical expression of the functional relationship. A linear example is $Q_{\text{s}}=325+P-30P_{\text{rg}}$ Here $325$ is the repository of all non-specified factors that affect supply for the product. The coefficient of $P$ is positive following the general rule that price and quantity supplied are directly related. $P_{\text{rg}}$ is the price of a related good. Typically, its coefficient is negative because the related good is an input or a source of inputs.

== Movements versus shifts ==
Movements along the curve occur only if there is a change in quantity supplied caused by a change in the good's own price. A shift in the supply curve, referred to as a change in supply, occurs only if a non-price determinant of supply changes. For example, if the price of an ingredient used to produce the good, a related good, were to increase, the supply curve would shift left.

== Inverse supply equation ==
By convention in the context of supply and demand graphs, economists graph the dependent variable (quantity) on the horizontal axis and the independent variable (price) on the vertical axis. The inverse supply equation is the equation written with the vertical-axis variable isolated on the left side: $P=f(Q)$. As an example, if the supply equation is $Q=40P-2P_{rg}$ then the inverse supply equation would be $P=\tfrac{Q}{40} + \tfrac{P_{rg}}{20}$.

== Marginal costs and short-run supply curve ==
A firm's short-run supply curve is the marginal cost curve above the shutdown point—the short-run marginal cost curve (SRMC) above the minimum average variable cost. The portion of the SRMC below the shutdown point is not part of the supply curve because the firm is not producing any output. The firm's long-run supply curve is that portion of the long-run marginal cost curve above the minimum of the long run average cost curve.

== Shape of the short-run supply curve ==
The Law of Diminishing Marginal Returns (LDMR) shapes the SRMC curve. The LDMR states that as production increases eventually a point (the point of diminishing marginal returns) will be reached after which additional units of output resulting from fixed increments of the labor input will be successively smaller. That is, beyond the point of diminishing marginal returns the marginal product of labor will continually decrease and hence a continually higher selling price would be necessary to induce the firm to produce more and more output.

== From firm to market supply curve ==
The market supply curve is the horizontal summation of firm supply curves.

The market supply curve can be translated into an equation. For a factor j for example the market supply function is

$S_j=S^j(p,r)$

where

$S_j=\sum^j_{k=1}S_{jk}$ and $S^j(p,r)=\sum^j_{k=1}S^{jk}(p,r)$ for all p > 0 and r > 0.

Note: not all assumptions that can be made for individual supply functions translate over to market supply functions directly.

== The shape of the market supply curve ==
The law of supply dictates that all other things remaining equal, an increase in the price of the good in question results in an increase in quantity supplied. In other words, the supply curve slopes upwards. However, there are exceptions to the law of supply. Not all supply curves slope upwards.

Some heterodox economists, such as Steve Keen and Dirk Ehnts, dispute this theory of the supply curve, arguing that the supply curve for mass-produced goods is often downward-sloping: as production increases, unit prices go down, and conversely, if demand is very low, unit prices go up. This corresponds to economies of scale.

== Elasticity ==
The price elasticity of supply (PES) measures the responsiveness of quantity supplied to changes in price, as the percentage change in quantity supplied induced by a one percent change in price. It is calculated for discrete changes as $\left ( \tfrac{\Delta Q}{\Delta P} \right ) \times \tfrac{P}{Q}$ and for smooth changes of differentiable supply functions as $\left ( \tfrac{\partial Q}{\partial P} \right ) \times \tfrac{P}{Q}$. Since supply is usually increasing in price, the price elasticity of supply is usually positive. For example, if the PES for a good is 0.67 a 1% rise in price will induce a two-thirds increase in quantity supplied.

Significant determinants include:

Complexity of production: Much depends on the complexity of the production process. Textile production is relatively simple. The labor is largely unskilled and production facilities are little more than buildings—no special structures are needed. Thus, the PES for textiles is elastic. On the other hand, the PES for specific types of motor vehicles is relatively inelastic. Auto manufacture is a multi-stage process that requires specialized equipment, skilled labor, a large suppliers network and large R&D costs.
Time to respond: The more time a producer has to respond to price changes the more elastic the supply. For example, a cotton farmer cannot immediately respond to an increase in the price of soybeans.
Excess capacity: A producer who has unused capacity can quickly respond to price changes in his market assuming that variable factors are readily available.
Inventories: A producer who has a supply of goods or available storage capacity can quickly respond to price changes.

Other elasticities can be calculated for non-price determinants of supply. For example, the percentage change the amount of the good supplied caused by a one percent increase in the price of a related good is an input elasticity of supply if the related good is an input in the production process. An example would be the change in the supply of cookies caused by a one percent increase in the price of sugar.

=== Elasticity along linear supply curves ===
The slope of a linear supply curve is constant; the elasticity is not. If the linear supply curve intersects the price axis, PES will be infinitely elastic at the point of intersection. The coefficient of elasticity decreases as one moves "up" the curve. However, all points on the supply curve will have a coefficient of elasticity greater than one. If the linear supply curve intersects the quantity axis PES will equal zero at the point of intersection and will increase as one moves up the curve; however, all points on the curve will have a coefficient of elasticity less than 1. If the linear supply curve intersects the origin PES equals one at the point of origin and along the curve.

== Market structure and the supply curve ==
There is no such thing as a monopoly supply curve. Perfect competition is the only market structure for which a supply function can be derived. In a perfectly competitive market the price is given by the marketplace from the point of view of the supplier; a manager of a competitive firm can state what quantity of goods will be supplied for any price by simply referring to the firm's marginal cost curve. To generate his supply function the seller could simply initially hypothetically set the price equal to zero and then incrementally increase the price; at each price he could calculate the hypothetical quantity supplied using the marginal cost curve. Following this process the manager could trace out the complete supply function. A monopolist cannot replicate this process because price is not imposed by the marketplace and hence is not an independent variable from the point of view of the firm; instead, the firm simultaneously chooses both the price and the quantity subject to the stipulation that together they form a point on the customers' demand curve. A change in demand can result in "changes in price with no changes in output, changes in output with no changes in price or both". There is simply not a one-to-one relationship between price and quantity supplied. There is no single function that relates price to quantity supplied.

== See also ==
- Aggregate Demand
- AD-AS model
- Demand curve
- Law of supply
- Profit maximization
- Supply and Demand
- Price elasticity of supply
