= Alchian–Allen effect =

Per-unit costs favor high-grade goods

The Alchian–Allen effect was described in 1964 by Armen Alchian and William R Allen in the book University Economics (now called Exchange and Production). It states that when the prices of two substitute goods, such as high and low grades of the same product, are both increased by a fixed per-unit amount such as a transportation cost or a lump-sum tax, consumption will shift toward the higher-grade product. This is because the added per-unit amount decreases the relative price of the higher-grade product.

Suppose, for example, that high-grade coffee beans are $3/pound and low-grade beans $1.50/pound; in this example, high-grade beans cost twice as much as low-grade beans. If a per-pound international shipping cost of $1 is added, the effective prices are now $4 and $2.50: High-grade beans now cost only 1.6 times as much as low-grade beans. This reduced ratio of difference will induce distant coffee-buyers to now choose a higher ratio of high-to-low grade beans than local coffee-buyers.

Another example is that the effect would predict that Australians drink higher-quality Californian wine than Californians, and vice versa, because it is only worth the transportation costs for the most expensive wine.

The effect has been studied as it applies to illegal drugs and it has been shown that the potency of marijuana increased in response to higher enforcement budgets, and there was a similar effect for alcohol in the U.S. during Prohibition. This effect is called iron law of prohibition.

Colloquially, the Alchian–Allen theorem is also known as the “shipping the good apples out” theorem (Thomas Borcherding), or as the “third law of demand.”

== See also ==
- Ramsey problem
- First law of demand
- Second law of demand (price elasticity over time)
- Iron law of prohibition
