= Inverse demand function =

Mathematical function in economics

In economics, an inverse demand function is the mathematical relationship that expresses price as a function of quantity demanded (it is therefore also known as a price function).

Historically, the economists first expressed the price of a good as a function of demand (holding the other economic variables, like income, constant), and plotted the price-demand relationship with demand on the x (horizontal) axis (the demand curve). Later the additional variables, like prices of other goods, came into analysis, and it became more convenient to express the demand as a multivariate function (the demand function): ${demand} = f({price}, {income}, ...)$, so the original demand curve now depicts the inverse demand function ${price} = f^{-1}({demand})$ with extra variables fixed.

== Definition ==
In mathematical terms, if the demand function is ${demand} = f({price})$, then the inverse demand function is ${price} = f^{-1}({demand})$. The value of the inverse demand function is the highest price that could be charged and still generate the quantity demanded. This is useful because economists typically place price (P) on the vertical axis and quantity (demand, Q) on the horizontal axis in supply-and-demand diagrams, so it is the inverse demand function that depicts the graphed demand curve in the way the reader expects to see.

The inverse demand function is the same as the average revenue function, since P = AR.

To compute the inverse demand function, simply solve for P from the demand function. For example, if the demand function has the form $Q = 240 - 2P$ then the inverse demand function would be $P = 120 - \frac{1}{2}Q$. Note that although price is the dependent variable in the inverse demand function, it is still the case that the equation represents how the price determines the quantity demanded, not the reverse.

== Relation to marginal revenue ==
There is a close relationship between any inverse demand function for a linear demand equation and the marginal revenue function. For any linear demand function with an inverse demand equation of the form P = a - bQ, the marginal revenue function has the form MR = a - 2bQ. The inverse linear demand function and the marginal revenue function derived from it have the following characteristics:

- Both functions are linear.
- The marginal revenue function and inverse demand function have the same y intercept.
- The x intercept of the marginal revenue function is one-half the x intercept of the inverse demand function.
- The marginal revenue function has twice the slope of the inverse demand function.
- The marginal revenue function is below the inverse demand function at every positive quantity.

The inverse demand function can be used to derive the total and marginal revenue functions. Total revenue equals price, P, times quantity, Q, or TR = P×Q. Multiply the inverse demand function by Q to derive the total revenue function: $TR = (120 - \frac{1}{2}Q)\cdot Q = 120 Q - \frac{1}{2}Q^2$. The marginal revenue function is the first derivative of the total revenue function or MR = 120 - Q. Note that in this linear example the MR function has the same y-intercept as the inverse demand function, the x-intercept of the MR function is one-half the value of the demand function, and the slope of the MR function is twice that of the inverse demand function. This relationship holds true for all linear demand equations. The importance of being able to quickly calculate MR is that the profit-maximizing condition for firms regardless of market structure is to produce where marginal revenue equals marginal cost (MC). To derive MC the first derivative of the total cost function is taken.

For example, assume cost, C, equals 420 + 60Q + Q^{2}. then MC = 60 + 2Q. Equating MR to MC and solving for Q gives Q = 20. So 20 is the profit-maximizing quantity: to find the profit-maximizing price simply plug the value of Q into the inverse demand equation and solve for P.

== See also ==
- Hicksian demand function
- Marshallian demand function
- Excess demand function
- Supply and demand
- Demand
- Law of demand
- Profit (economics)
