= Law of demand =

Fundamental principle in microeconomics

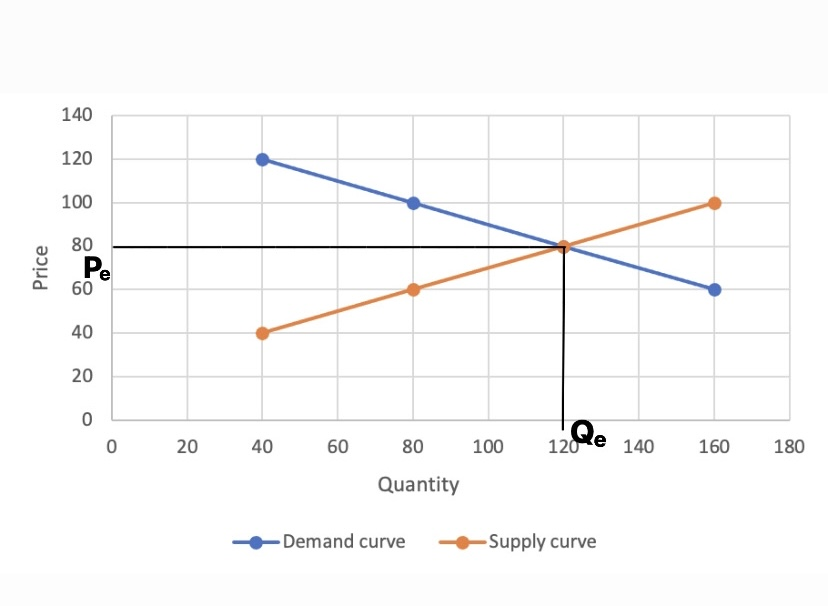
The demand curve, shown in blue, is sloping downwards from left to right because price and quantity demanded are inversely related. This relationship is contingent on certain conditions remaining constant. The supply curve, shown in orange, intersects with the demand curve at price (Pe) = 80 and quantity (Qe)= 120. Pe = 80 is the equilibrium price at which quantity demanded is equal to the quantity supplied. Similarly, Qe = 120 is the equilibrium quantity at which the quantity demanded and supplied are at the equilibrium price. Therefore, the intersection of the demand and supply curves provide us with the efficient allocation of goods in an economy.

In microeconomics, the law of demand is a fundamental principle which states that there is an inverse relationship between price and quantity demanded. In other words, "conditional on all else being equal, as the price of a good increases (↑), quantity demanded will decrease (↓); conversely, as the price of a good decreases (↓), quantity demanded will increase (↑)". Alfred Marshall worded this as: "When we say that a person's demand for anything increases, we mean that he will buy more of it than he would before at the same price, and that he will buy as much of it as before at a higher price". The law of demand, however, only makes a qualitative statement in the sense that it describes the direction of change in the amount of quantity demanded but not the magnitude of change.

The law of demand is represented by a graph called the demand curve, with quantity demanded on the x-axis and price on the y-axis. Demand curves are downward sloping by definition of the law of demand. The law of demand also works together with the law of supply to determine the efficient allocation of resources in an economy through the equilibrium price and quantity.

The relationship between price and quantity demanded holds true so long as it is complied with the ceteris paribus condition "all else remain equal" quantity demanded varies inversely with price when income and the prices of other goods remain constant. If all else are not held equal, the law of demand may not necessarily hold. In the real world, there are many determinants of demand other than price, such as the prices of other goods, the consumer's income, preferences etc. There are also exceptions to the law of demand such as Giffen goods and perfectly inelastic goods.

== Overview ==
Economist Alfred Marshall provided the graphical illustration of the law of demand. This graphical illustration is still used today to define and explain a variety of other concepts and theories in economics. A simple explanation of the law of demand is that all else equal, at a higher price, consumer will demand less quantity of a good and vice versa. The law of demand applies to a variety of organisational and business situations. Price determination, government policy formation etc are examples. Together with the law of supply, the law of demand provides to us the equilibrium price and quantity. Moreover, the law of demand and supply explains why goods are priced at the level that they are. They also help us identify opportunities to buy what are perceived to be underpriced (or sell overpriced) goods or assets.

Law of Demand is relied heavily upon by managerial economics, which is a branch of economics that applies microeconomic analysis to managerial decision-making, to make informed decisions on pricing, production, and marketing strategies. In this context, understanding the alternative factors that influence the Law of Demand becomes crucial for managers and decision-makers.

1. Income effect: The income effect is the change in the quantity demanded of a good or service as a result of changes in consumers' purchasing power. When prices increase, the purchasing power of consumers decreases, leading to a decline in the quantity demanded. Conversely, a decrease in prices will increase purchasing power and lead to an increase in the quantity demanded.
2. Substitution effect: The substitution effect is the change in the quantity demanded of a good or service due to a change in the relative prices of substitute goods. When the price of a good increases, consumers may shift their consumption to relatively cheaper substitute goods, causing the demand for the original good to decrease.
3. Price expectations: Consumer expectations about future prices can influence their current demand for goods or services. If consumers expect prices to rise in the future, they may increase their current consumption to avoid higher prices later. Conversely, if they expect prices to fall, they may delay consumption, causing a decline in the quantity demanded.
4. Market size and demographics: The size of the market and its demographics can also influence the Law of Demand. Changes in population size, age distribution, and income levels can affect the overall demand for goods or services, thus impacting the relationship between price and quantity demanded.

Demand refers to the demand curve. A change in demand is indicated by a shift in the demand curve. Quantity demanded, on the other hand refers to a specific point on the demand curve which corresponds to a specific price. A change in quantity demanded therefore refers to a movement along the existing demand curve. However, there are some exceptions to the law of demand. For instance, if the price of cigarettes goes up, its demand does not decrease. The exceptions to the law of demand typically suit the Giffen commodities and Veblen goods which is further explained below.

The four main types of elasticity of demand are price elasticity of demand, cross elasticity of demand, income elasticity of demand, and advertising elasticity of demand.

== History ==
The famous law of demand was first stated by Charles Davenant (1656-1714) in his essay, "Probable Methods of Making People Gainers in the Balance of Trade (1699)". However, there were instances of its understanding and use much earlier when Gregory King (1648-1712) made a demonstration of the law of demand. He represented a relationship between the price of wheat and the harvest where the results suggested that if the harvest falls by 50%, the price would rise by 500%. This demonstration illustrated the law of demand as well as its elasticity.

Skipping forward to 1890, economist Alfred Marshall documented the graphical illustration of the law of demand. In Principles of Economics (1890), Alfred Marshall reconciled the demand and supply into a single analytical framework. The formulation of the demand curve was provided by the utility theory while supply curve was determined by the cost. This idea of demand and supply curve is what we still use today to develop the market equilibrium and to support a variety of other economic theories and concepts. Due to general agreement with the observation, economists have come to accept the validity of the law under most situations. Economist also see Alfred Marshall as the pioneer of the standard demand and supply diagrams and their use in economic analysis including welfare applications and consumer surplus.

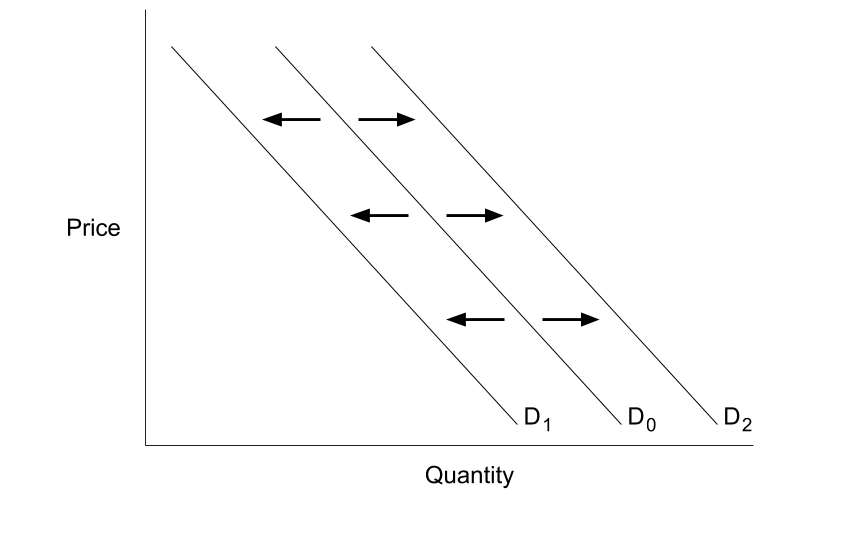
Anything that affects the buying decision other than the product price will shift the demand curve. Considering our example of mortgage rates; with a higher mortgage rate, demand curve will shift to the left from D0 to D1. This means that there is less demand for the housing market at every price. On the other hand, with lower mortgage rate demand curve shifts to the right from D0 to D2, meaning there is more demand for the housing market at every price.

== Mathematical description ==
Consider the function $\ Q_x = f(P_x ; \mathbf Y)$, where $Q_x$ is the quantity demanded of good $x$, $f$ is the demand function, < The law of demand states that $\frac{\partial f}{\partial P_x} < 0$. Here $\partial/\partial P_x$ is the partial derivative operator.

The above equation, when plotted with quantity demanded ($Q_x$) on the $x$-axis and price ($P_x$) on the $y$-axis, gives the demand curve, which is also known as the demand schedule. The demand curve is downward sloping illustrating the inverse relationship between quantity demanded and price. Therefore, a downward sloping demand curve embeds the law of demand.

In a more specific manner:

$$Qdx = f(P_x, I, P_y, T)$$

Which is a functional relationship where the quantity demanded by the consumer $Qdx$ depends on the price of the good $P_x$, the monetary income of the consumer $I$, the prices of other goods $P_y$, and the taste of the consumer $T$.

Another common way to express the law of demand without imposing a functional form is the following:

$$(p'-p)(x'-x)\leq 0$$

This formula states that, for all possible prices p' and p, and corresponding demands x' and x, prices and demand must move in opposite directions, i.e. as price increases, demand must decrease and vice versa. Note that demands are demand bundles, not individual demands. Demand for a single good can still increase even though its price also increased, if there is another good whose price increased and which is sufficiently substituted away from. If good i is a Giffen good whose price increases while other goods' prices are held fixed (so that $p_j'-p_j=0 \; \forall j\neq i$), the law of demand is clearly violated, as we have both $p_i'-p_i>0$ (as price increased) and $q_i'-q_i>0$ (as we consider a Giffen good), so that $(p'-p)(x'-x)=(p_i'-p_i)(x_i'-x_i)>0$.

== Demand versus supply ==
On the one hand, demand refers to the demand curve. Changes in supply are depicted graphically by a shift in the supply curve to the left or right. Changes in the demand curve are usually caused by 5 major factors, namely: number of buyers, consumer income, tastes or preferences, price of related goods and future expectations.

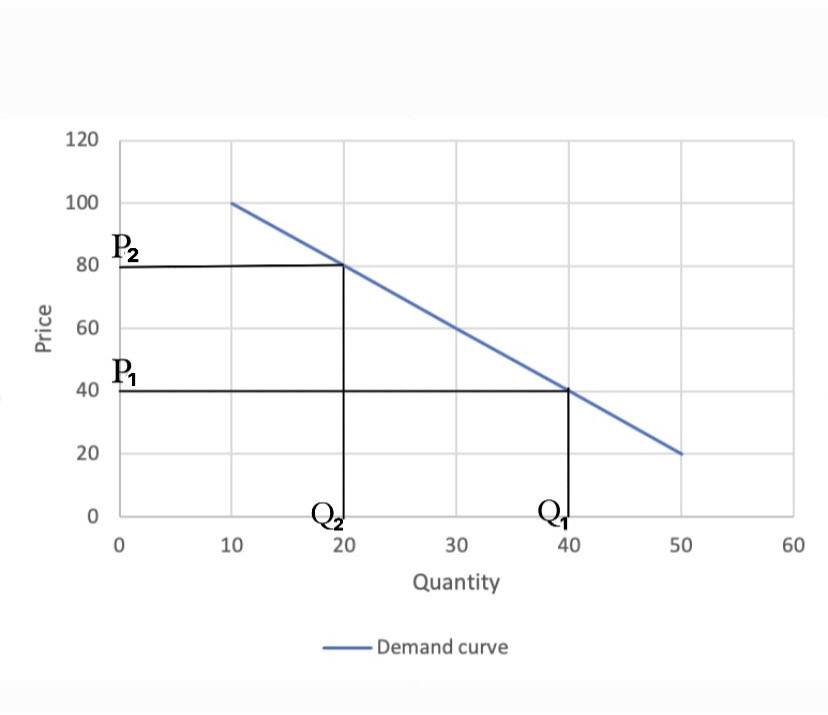
A change in quantity demanded is shown by a movement along the existing demand curve. By starting out at P1, the associated willingness to purchase or quantity demanded is Q1. Now, if price goes up to P2, there is a lower willingness to purchase i.e., quantity demanded is Q2. The demand curve itself did not change since both the combination of P1Q1 and P2Q2 were already a part of the existing demand curve.

On the other hand, quantity demanded refers to a specific point located on the demand curve which corresponds to a specific price. Therefore, quantity demanded represents the exact quantity of a good or service demanded by a consumer at a particular price, conditional on the other determinants. A change in quantity demanded can be indicated by a movement along the existing demand curve that is caused only by a change in price.

For instance, let's take the example of a housing market. An increase or decrease in price of housing will not shift the demand curve rather it will cause a movement along the demand curve for housing i.e. change in quantity demanded. But if we look at mortgage rates (a factor other than price), even if housing prices remain unchanged, an increased mortgage rate leads to a lower willingness to buy at all prices, shifting the demand curve to the left. Consumers will buy less, even though the price is the same. On the other hand, lower mortgage rate leads to a higher willingness to buy at all prices, and eventually shifting the demand curve to the right. Consumers will now buy more, even though the price has not changed at all. Such variation in demand can be explained by demand elasticity.

== Demand elasticity ==
The elasticity of demand refers to the sensitivity of a goods demand as compared to the fluctuation of other economic factors, such as price, income, etc. The law of demand explains that the relationship between Demand and Price is directly inverse. However, the demand for some goods are more receptive to a change in price than others. There are four major elasticities of demand, these being the price elasticity of demand, income elasticity of demand, cross elasticity of demand, and advertising elasticity of demand.

=== Price elasticity of demand ===
The variation in demand with regards to a change in price is known as the price elasticity of demand. The formula to solve for the coefficient of price elasticity of demand is the percentage change in quantity demanded divided by the percentage change in Price.

$$E_{\langle p \rangle} = \frac{\Delta Q/Q}{\Delta P/P}$$

Price elasticity of demand can be classified as elastic, inelastic, or unitary. An elastic demand occurs when the percentage change in the quantity demanded is greater than the percentage change in price, meaning that a small change in price results in a large change in quantity demanded. Inelastic demand occurs when the percentage change in quantity demanded is smaller than the percentage change in price. Unitary elasticity occurs when the percentage change in quantity demanded is equal to the percentage change in price.

Factors affecting price elasticity of demand include the availability of substitute goods, the proportion of income spent on the good, the nature of the good (whether it's a necessity or a luxury), and the time horizon under consideration.

=== Cross elasticity of demand ===
The cross elasticity of demand is an economic concept that measures the relative change in demand of a good when another good varies in price. The formula to solve for the coefficient of cross elasticity of demand is calculated by dividing the percentage change in quantity demanded of good A by the percentage change in price of good B.

$$\text{Cross-price Elasticity Of Demand}
= \frac{\%\text{ change in quantity demanded of good A}}{\%\text{ change in price of good B}}$$

The Cross elasticity of demand, also commonly referred to as the Cross-price elasticity of demand, allows companies to establish competitive prices against substitute goods and complementary goods. The metric figure produced by the equation thus determines the strength of both the relationship and competition between the two goods.

=== Income elasticity of demand ===
Income elasticity of demand is an economic measurement tool developed to measure the sensitivity of a goods quantity demanded when there is a change in the real income of a consumer. To calculate the income elasticity of demand, the percentage change in quantity demanded is divided by the percentage change in the consumers income.

$$\epsilon_d = \frac{\%\ \mbox{change in quantity demanded}}{\%\ \mbox{change in income}}$$

The Income elasticity of demand allows businesses to analyse and further predict the impact of business cycles on total sales. The Income elastitcty of demand thus allows goods to be broadly categorised as Normal goods and Inferior goods. A positive measurement suggests that the good is a normal good, and a negative measurement suggests an inferior good. The Income elasticity of demand effectively represents a consumers idea as to whether a good is a luxury or a necessity.

=== Advertising elasticity of demand ===
Advertising elasticity of demand measures the effectiveness of an advertising campaign as to generate new sales. To calculate the Advertising elasticity of demand, the percentage change in quantity demanded is divided by the percentage change in advertising expenditures.

$$AED = \frac{\%\ \mbox{change in quantity demanded}}{\%\ \mbox{change in spending on advertising}} = \frac{\Delta Q_d/Q_d}{\Delta A/A}$$

A business utilises the advertising elasticity of demand to measure the effectiveness of advertising on generating new sales. A positive elasticity indicates success for the advertisement as demand for the goods has increased. However, this measurement is also subject to the availability of substitutes, consumer behaviours and price points of the good being advertised.

== Exceptions to the law of demand ==
The elasticity of demand follows the law of demand and its definition. However, there are goods and specific situations that defy the law of demand. Generally, the amount demanded of a good increases with a decrease in price of the good and vice versa. In some cases this may not be true. There are certain goods which do not follow the law of demand. These include Giffen goods, Veblen goods, basic or necessary goods and expectations of future price changes. Further exception and details are given in the sections below:

=== Giffen goods ===
Initially proposed by Sir Robert Giffen, economists disagree on the existence of Giffen goods in the market. A Giffen good describes an inferior good that, as the price increases, demand for the product increases. As an example, during the Great Famine of Ireland of the 19th century, potatoes were considered a Giffen good. Potatoes were the largest staple in the Irish diet, so as the price rose it had a large impact on income. People responded by cutting out on luxury goods such as meat and vegetables, and instead bought more potatoes. Therefore, as the price of potatoes increased, so did the quantity demanded. This results in an upward sloping demand curve contrary to the fundamental law of demand.

Giffen goods violate the law of demand due to the income effect dominating the substitution effect. This can be illustrated with the Slutsky equation for a change in a good's own price:

$$\frac{\partial x_i}{\partial p_i} = \frac{\partial h_i}{\partial p_i} - \frac{\partial x_i}{\partial m}x_i$$

The first term on the right-hand side is the substitution effect, which is always negative. The second term on the right side is the income effect, which can be positive or negative. For inferior goods, this is negative, so subtracting this means adding its positive absolute value. The non-derivative component of the income effect is a measure of a consumer's existing demand for the good, meaning that if a consumer spends a large amount of his income on an inferior good, then a price increase could cause the income effect to dominate the substitution effect. This leads to a positive partial derivative of the good's demand with regards to its price, which violates the law of demand.

=== Expectation of change in the price of commodity ===
If an increase in the price of a commodity causes households to expect the price of a commodity to increase further, they may start purchasing a greater amount of the commodity even at the presently increased price. Similarly, if the household expects the price of the commodity to decrease, it may postpone its purchases. Thus, some argue that the law of demand is violated in such cases. In this case, the demand curve does not slope down from left to right; instead, it presents a backward slope from the top right to down left. This curve is known as an exceptional demand curve.

=== Basic or necessary goods ===
The goods which people need no matter how high the price is are basic or necessary goods. Medicines covered by insurance are a good example. An increase or decrease in the price of such a good does not affect its quantity demanded.

=== Certain scenarios in stock trading ===
Stock buyers acting in accord with the hot-hand fallacy will increase buying when stock prices are trending upward. Other rationales for buying a high-priced stock are that previous buyers who bid up the price are proof of the issue's quality, or conversely, that an issue's low price may be evidence of viability problems.

=== Veblen goods ===
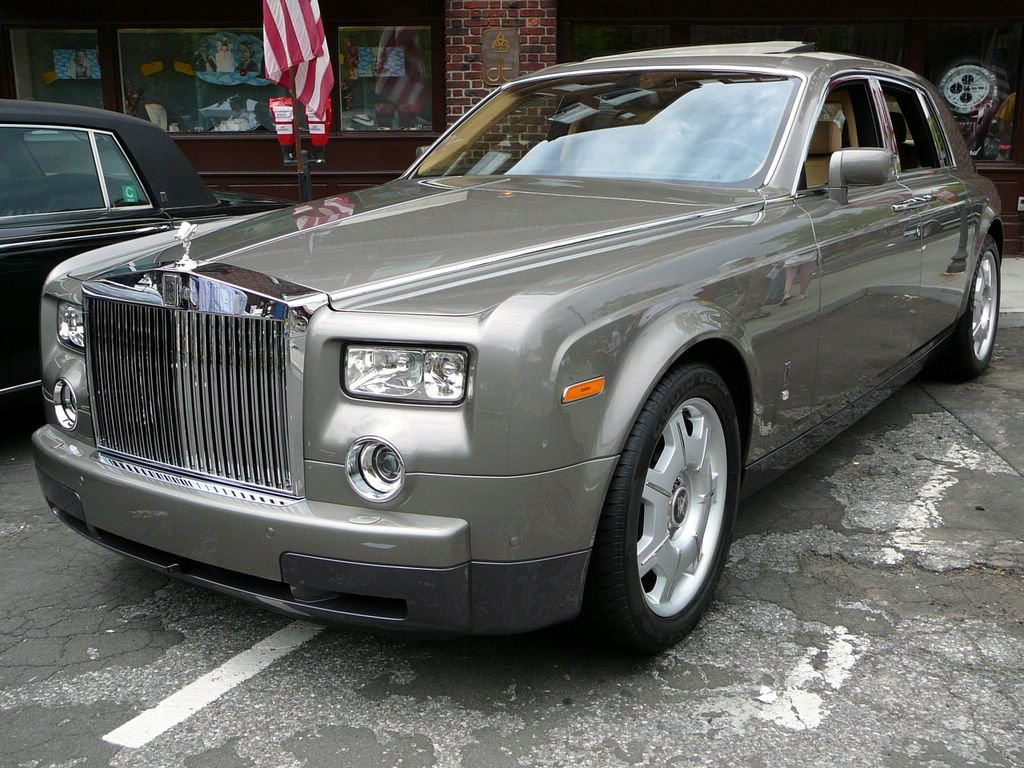
Named after the American economist Thorstein Veblen, Veblen goods are luxury items. They are perceived as status symbols and include diamonds and luxury cars.

Unlike Giffen goods, which are inferior items, Veblen goods are generally high quality goods. The demand for Veblen goods increases with the increase in price. Examples of Veblen goods are mostly luxurious items such as diamond, gold, precious stones, world-famous paintings, antiques etc. Veblen goods appear to go against the law of demand because of their exclusivity appeal, in the sense that if a price of a luxurious and expensive product is increased, it may attract the status-conscious group more, since it will be further out of reach for an average consumer. Thorstein Veblen referred to this sort of consumption as the purchase of goods that do not exhibit additional utility or functionality but offer status and reveal socioeconomic position. In simple words, these goods are not bought for their satisfaction but for their "snob appeal" or "ostentation". Accordingly, all these factors also lead to an upward sloping demand curve for Veblen goods along a certain price range.

Gary S. Becker and Kevin M. Murphy analysed Veblen goods. Their analysis of the demand for paintings by masters and for other objects proves Veblen by relying heavily on the allocative role of prices in markets with social interactions.

== See also ==
- Revealed preference
- Aggregation problem
- Representative agent
- Methodological individualism
- Demand (economics)
- Price–performance ratio
- Second law of demand (price elasticity over time)
- Third Law of Demand (Alchian–Allen effect)
- Supply and demand
- Law of supply
- Tragedy of the commons
