= Dirk Ehnts =

German economist

- Born: 11 April 1977 (age 49); Bremen, Germany

Academic work
- Discipline: Modern Monetary Theory; Political economy; Macroeconomics
- School or tradition: Modern Monetary Theory
- Institutions: University of Göttingen, Germany

Dirk H. Ehnts (born 1977) is a German heterodox economist. He is one of the leading proponents of Modern Monetary Theory in Europe.

== Early life and studies ==
Ehnts was born in Bremen, Germany and finished high school there. He studied Economics from 1997 to 2002 at the University of Göttingen with one semester spent at the University of Valencia and graduated with a diploma. He was awarded a full scholarship for his PhD studies 2003-2005 and then was a research assistant at the University of Oldenburg between 2006 and 2012, from which, in 2008 he was received his Economics Ph.D. summa cum laude.

== Career ==
Ehnts worked as a visiting lecturer at the Berlin School of Economics and Law between 2012 and 2014, where he taught classes on macroeconomics, money, and currency. Within that period, he undertook a semester off to work as visiting professor at the Latin America Institute of the Free University of Berlin. In 2015, he moved to the Bard College Berlin, while from the end of 2016 to mid-2017 and again since May 2018, he has been teaching at the Chemnitz University of Technology. In between he taught at Europa-Universität Flensburg as a visiting professor for European economics. He now teaches at Steinbeis University and Torrens University Australia.

Ehnts is a member of the standing field committee History of Economic Thought of the German economists association. Every summer since 2016 Ehnts has held a course on Modern Monetary Theory at the Summer School of Maastricht University. In February 2019, he organized the 1st European MMT Conference, while in July 2019, together with Pavlina Tcherneva and Esteban Cruz-Hidalgo, they advocated the introduction of a European finance ministry (the so-called "Euro Treasury") and a job guarantee for Europe. The 2nd European MMT conference took place in 2021, the 3rd in 2023. Ehnts is also a lecturer at the MMT summer school at the University of Poznan in Poland.

Ehnts has published numerous articles in specialist journals and daily newspapers.

In 2019, he was invited by the Bundestag to provide expert testimony on the TARGET2 real-time gross settlement system of the Eurozone. He was the first economist there to point out that TARGET assets and liabilities are not debts. In 2021, he appeared as an expert on the finance committee of the Irish Parliament.

During the time leading up to the 2019 European elections, he was the main architect of Socialist Youth Austria's candidate Julia Herr Green New Deal platform. He co-authored the Green New Deal for Europe.

== Personal life ==
Ehnts lives in Berlin with his wife and their two children.

== Selected works ==
- Ehnts, Dirk (2024), Modern Money Theory: A Simple Guide to the Monetary System, Springer, ISBN 978-3031535369
- Ehnts, Dirk and L. Randall Wray (2024), Revisiting MMT, Sovereign Currencies and the Eurozone: A Reply to Marc Lavoie, Review of Political Economy, doi: https://doi.org/10.1080/09538259.2023.2298448
- Ehnts, Dirk (16 June 2017). Modern Monetary Theory and European Macroeconomics. Routledge. 222. ISBN 9781138299924.
- Ehnts, Dirk and Michael Paetz (2021), COVID-19 and its economic consequences for the Euro Area, Eurasian Economic Review, 11, 227–249
- Ehnts, Dirk (2022), Modern Monetary Theory: Eine Einführung, Wiesbaden: Springer, ISBN 978-3658364878
- Ehnts, Dirk (2020). Geld und Kredit: eine €-päische Perspektive, 4th ed [Money and credit: A €-pean perspective] (in German). Marburg: Metropolis. ISBN 978-3731614333.
- Christiansen, Ole; Ehnts, Dirk H.; Trautwein, Hans-Michael (2010). "Industry relocation, linkages and spillovers across the Baltic Sea: extending the footloose capital model". Baltic Journal of Economics. 10 (1): 61–78. doi:10.1080/1406099X.2010.10840471. S2CID 53972332.
