= Derived demand =

In economics, derived demand is demand for a factor of production or intermediate good that occurs as a result of the demand for another intermediate or final good. In essence, the demand for, say, a factor of production by a firm is dependent on the demand by consumers for the product produced by the firm. The term was first introduced by Alfred Marshall in his Principles of Economics in 1890. Demand for all factors of production is considered as derived demand.

This is similar to the concept of joint demand or complementary goods, the quantity consumed of one of them depending positively on the quantity of the other consumed. Example if any goods is in production process by demanding capital automatically speed of production will increase that is directly demand or derived demand.

== Examples ==
Producers have a derived demand for employees. The employees themselves do not appear in the employer's utility function; rather, they enable employers to profit by fulfilling the demand by consumers for their product. Thus the demand for labour is a derived demand from the demand for goods and services.

For example, if the demand for a good such as wheat increases, then this leads to an increase in the demand for labour, as well as demand for other factors of production such as fertilizer.

For another example, demand for steel leads to derived demand for steel workers, as steel workers are necessary for the production of steel. As the demand for steel increases, so does its price. The increase in price means manufacturers of steel can gain more in revenue if they produce more steel, thus leading to a higher demand for the resources involved in producing steel.

Demand for transport is another good example of derived demand, as users of transport are very often consuming the service not because they benefit from consumption directly (except in cases such as pleasure cruises), but because they wish to partake in other consumption elsewhere.

Another example is the derived demand for labour - the amount of labour demanded in the production of soap depends upon the demand for soap, that workers help produce

== Derived demand curve ==
The concept of the derived demand curve for an input was developed by Alfred Marshall. It can be constructed under two assumptions: First, production conditions, the demand curve for the final good, and the supply curves for all other factors of production are held constant. Second, competitive markets for the final good and all other factors of production are always in equilibrium.

The derived demand curve answers the question what quantity, x, of the selected factor of production would be demanded at an arbitrary price, y, under the above conditions. The inverse of the relationship, y = f (x), is the graphical representation of Marshall’s derived demand curve for the selected factor of production. Its equilibrium price and quantity are determined by the intersection of this demand curve with the supply curve of the factor of production.

== Low elasticity of derived demand ==
A low elasticity of derived demand encourages supply restrictions. A low elasticity results out of a lack of a good substitute, an inelastic demand for the final good and inelastic supply of other factors of production. Furthermore, the selected factor of production's expenditure share must be small compared to the total production cost which is often referred to as the 'importance of being unimportant'.

John Hicks relaxed the assumption of fixed production coefficients which imply a lack of good substitutes in his new concept of the elasticity of substitution. According to him, in order for elasticity of derived demand to be low, ‘It is “important to be unimportant” only when the consumer can substitute more easily than the entrepreneur’. In other words, only when the elasticity of demand for the product exceeds the elasticity of input substitution, it is important that the factor of production's expenditure share is small compared to the total production cost.
