= Property rights (economics) =

Economics concept

Property rights are constructs in economics for determining how a resource or economic good is used and owned, which have developed over ancient and modern history, from Abrahamic law to Article 17 of the Universal Declaration of Human Rights. Resources can be owned by (and hence be the property of) individuals, associations, collectives, or governments.

Property rights can be viewed as an attribute of an economic good. This attribute has three broad components, and is often referred to as a bundle of rights in the United States:

1. usus: the right to use the good
2. fructus: the right to earn income from the good
3. abusus: the right to transfer the good to others, alter it, abandon it, or destroy it (the right to ownership cessation)

Economists such as Adam Smith stress that the expectation of profit from "improving one's stock of capital" rests on the concept of private property rights.

== Conceptualizing property in economics vs. law ==
The fields of economics and law do not have a general consensus on conceptions of property rights. Various property types are used in law but the terminology can be seen in economic reports. Sometimes in economics, property types are simply described as private or public/common in reference to private goods (excludable and rivalrous goods like a phone), as well as public goods (non-excludable and non-rivalrous goods, like air), respectively. Below is a list of the several property types defined and their relation to the economic concepts of excludability (the ability to limit the consumption of the good) and rivalry (a person's consumption of the good reduces the ability of another to consume it).

=== Types of property regimes ===
- Property rights can be categorized with excludability and rivalry. Excludability describes the characteristic regarding whether a good can be withheld from certain consumers. In terms of the same good, rivalry describes its accessibility to competing consumers. The combination of excludability and rivalry as parameters is reflected through various types of property rights.
- Open-access property is owned by nobody (res nullius). It is non-excludable, as excluding people is either impossible or prohibitively costly, and can be rivalrous or non-rivalrous. Open-access property is not managed by anyone, and access to it is not controlled. This is also known as a common property resource, impure public good or sometimes erroneously as a common pool resource. A common pool resource however is often managed the group of people that have access to that resource . Examples of this can be air, water, sights, and sounds. Tragedy of the commons refers to this title. An example would be unregulated forests as there's limited resources available and therefore rivalrous, but anyone may access these resources. If non-rivalrous, it would be a public good (cannot be rivalrous, no matter how much it is used, for example, the ocean (outside of territorial borders)).

Open-access property may exist because ownership has never been established, granted, by laws within a particular country, or because no effective controls are in place, or feasible, i.e., the cost of exclusivity outweighs the benefits.

— Encyclopedia of Law and Economics

- Public property, also known as state property, is excludable and can be rivalrous or non-rivalrous. This type of property is publicly owned, but its access and use are managed and controlled by a government agency or organization granted such authority. For example, a government pavement is non-excludable as anyone may use it but rivalrous as, the more people using it, the more likely it will be too crowded for another to join. Public property is sometimes used interchangeably with public good, usually impure public goods. They may also be a club good, which is excludable and non-rivalrous. An example would be paying to go to an uncongested public bathroom, as the price excludes those who can't afford it but there is ample utilities for more people to use making it non-rivalrous.
- Private property is both excludable and rivalrous. Private property access, use, exclusion and management are controlled by the private owner or a group of legal owners. This is sometimes used interchangeably with private good. An example would be a cellphone as it only one person may use it, making it rivalrous, and it has to be purchased, which makes it excludable.
- Common property or collective property is excludable and rivalrous. Not to be confused with common property in reference to economics, this is in reference to law. It is property that is owned by a group of individuals where access, use, and exclusion are controlled by the joint owners. Unlike private property, common property has multiple owners, which allows for a greater ability to manage conflicts through shared benefits and enforcement. This would still be related to private goods. An example of common property would be any private good that is jointly owned.

== Theory ==
Property rights theory is an exploration of how providing stakeholders with ownership of any factors of production or goods, not just land, will increase the efficiency of an economy as the gains from providing the rights exceed the costs. A widely accepted explanation is that well-enforced property rights provide incentives for individuals to participate in economic activities, such as investment, innovation and trade, which lead to a more efficient market. Implicit or explicit property rights can be created through government regulation in the market, either through prescriptive command and control approaches (e.g. limits on input/output/discharge quantities, specified processes/equipment, audits) or by market-based instruments (e.g. taxes, transferable permits or quotas), and more recently through cooperative, self-regulatory, post-regulatory and reflexive law approaches. In economics, depending on the level of transaction costs, various forms of property rights institutions will develop. In economics, an institution is defined thusly:

a complex of positions, roles, norms and values lodged in particular types of social structures and organising relatively stable patterns of human activity with respect to fundamental problems in producing life-sustaining resources, in reproducing individuals, and in sustaining viable societal structures within a given environment.

— Johnathon Turner, The Institutional Order

For specificity in the case of economic property rights, this is a system or structure that has value and stability. Transaction costs are the costs of defining, monitoring, and enforcing property rights.

=== Economic development ===
John Locke, Adam Smith, and Karl Marx are economists that generally recognize the importance of property rights in the process of economic development, and modern mainstream economics agree with such a recognition. Locke supposed that one's labour was their own property and, consequently, property was any land maintained and sustained through one's own labour as long as there was sufficient and similar quality land to meet the needs of everyone's labour. Using this ideology, property in a broader sense would be taken as any good a person produced or maintains with their own labour. This was later elaborated on by Smith, who believed that the amount of labour it takes to produce a good does not provide its value but instead the labour the good commands or the value of goods people will be willing to trade for the good. He felt the division of labour to produce products for others was better for the whole of society. This was later critiqued by Marx.

=== Incomplete contracts ===
Sanford Grossman, Oliver Hart, and John Hardman Moore developed the property rights approach to the theory of the firm based on the paradigm of incomplete contracts. These authors argue that in the real world, contracts are incomplete and hence it is impossible to contractually specify what decisions will have to be taken in any conceivable state of the world. There will be renegotiations in the future, so parties have insufficient investment incentives (since they will only get a fraction of the investment's return in future negotiations); i.e., there is a hold-up problem. Hence, they argue property rights matter because they determine who has control over future decisions if no agreement will be reached. In other words, property rights determine the parties' future bargaining positions (while their bargaining powers, i.e. their fractions of the renegotiation surplus, are independent of the property rights allocation). The property rights approach to the theory of the firm can thus explain pros and cons of integration in the context of private firms. Yet, it has also been applied in various other frameworks such as public good provision and privatization. The property rights approach has been extended in many directions. For instance, some authors have studied different bargaining solutions, while other authors have studied the role of asymmetric information.

Three important criteria for efficiency of property rights are

(1) universality—all scarce resources are owned by someone;

(2) exclusivity—property rights are exclusive rights;

(3) transferability—to ensure that resources can be allocated from low to high yield uses

— Joseph Mahoney, Economic Foundations of Strategy, pg 109

=== Real-world interconnectivity ===
As a nation grows the necessity for well-defined property rights grows as well. This is due to the underlying assumption that within property rights other people must be present in order to have the rights over somebody else. Additionally, property rights are foundational for a capitalist system, allowing for growth and wealth creation.

=== Rent-seeking ===
North, Wallis and Weingast argue that property rights originate to facilitate elites' rent-seeking activities. Particularly, the legal and political systems that protect elites' claims on rent revenues form the basis of the so-called "limited access order", in which non-elites are denied access to political power and economic privileges. In a historical study of medieval England, for instance, North and Thomas find that the dramatic development of English land laws in the 13th century resulted from elites' interests in exploiting rent revenues from land ownership after a sudden rise in land price in the 12th century. In contrast, the modern "open access order", which consists of a democratic political system and a free- market economy, usually features widespread, secure and impersonal property rights. Universal property rights, along with impersonal economic and political competition, downplay the role of rent-seeking and instead favor innovations and productive activities in a modern economy.

=== Benefits of stronger property rights ===
One benefit of implementing property rights is that opportunism is discouraged, as it is harder to exploit a good protected by enforced property rights. For example, a song can be easily pirated from purchased copies and, with no punishment, this form of the free-rider problem likely occurs. This causes the price mechanism to be less effective at finding the true market equilibrium and hurts the owners of the good who did not get it through opportunism.

Another benefit is that the moral hazard is less likely to influence the actions of consumers, meaning they will be less likely to exploit resources unsustainably or inefficiently as property is protected. This will lead to a lower group cost overall as people will not be able to exploit these resources as easily, causing less inefficiency issues. For example, if a person's car doesn't have property rights, people will be more likely to mistreat it or steal it for a drive, as there is no real repercussions for doing so.

Property rights are also believed to lower transaction costs by providing an efficient resolution for conflicts over scarce resources. Empirically, using historical data of former European colonies, Acemoglu, Johnson and Robinson find substantial evidence that good economic institutions – those that provide secure property rights and equality of opportunity – lead to economic prosperity.

In 2013 a study found that better protection of property rights can affect several development outcomes, including better management of natural resources.

Incomplete property rights allow agents with valuation lower than that of the original owners of economic value to inefficiently expropriate them distorting in this way their investment and effort exertion decisions. The state might also expropriate private parties if property rights are not sufficiently ensured by a political process.

Various legal systems protect property rights from state actors to different degrees. In the United States the U.S. Constitution contains a number of provisions that protect property rights, including in the Fifth and Fourteenth Amendments. Courts have at times enforced these provisions in ways that give a high degree of protection but also in ways that fall far short of that. The Fifth Amendment's requirement that the government pay "just compensation" when it takes property has generally been enforced when it comes to takings of real property, even if the fairness of the amount awarded can be debated. In contrast, the Fifth Amendment's requirement that takings be only for "public use" has received less protection by the Supreme Court. In the 2005 case Kelo v. City of New London, the U.S. Supreme Court stated that if a city believes that taking private property and giving it to another private owner might result in higher tax revenues then it constitutes a "public use." This resulted in the destruction of a neighborhood in New London, Connecticut on land that then sat vacant for years as the city's plan for economic development failed to materialize.

=== Effect of high transaction costs ===
Guido Calabresi and Douglas Melamed argue that in case of transaction costs sufficiently sizeable to prevent consensual trade, legalized private expropriation in the form of, for instance, liability rules can be welfare-increasing. To elaborate, when property is fully protected, some agents with valuation higher than that of the original owners will be unable to legally acquire value because of sizable transaction costs. When the protection of property is weak instead, low-valuation potential buyers inefficiently expropriate original owners. Hence, a rise in the heterogeneity of the potential buyers' valuations makes inefficient expropriation by low-valuation potential buyers be more important from a social welfare point of view than inefficient exclusion from trade and so induces stronger property rights. Crucially, this prediction survives even after considering production and investment activities and it is consistent with a novel dataset on the rules on the acquisition of ownership through adverse possession and on the use of government takings to transfer real property from a private party to another private party prevailing in 126 jurisdictions. These data measure "horizontal property rights" and thus the extent of protection of property from "direct and indirect private takings", which are ubiquitous forms of expropriation that occur daily within the rule of law and are thus different from predation by the state and the elites, which is much less common but has been the focus of the economics literature.

=== Natural rights and deontological justifications ===
In contrast to the consequentialist and institutional approaches that dominate much of the economic analysis of property rights, natural rights and deontological theories ground property in inherent moral claims or logical requirements of human agency and self-ownership. These justifications treat property rights as existing prior to (or independently of) their economic effects, positive law, or social utility calculations.

==== Lockean labor theory ====
John Locke, in his Second Treatise of Government (1689), developed one of the most influential natural-rights accounts. Locke held that every individual has a property in their own person (self-ownership). By mixing their labor with previously unowned resources in the state of nature, a person acquires a property right in the product, provided that "enough and as good" remains available for others, the so-called Lockean proviso. This labor theory of acquisition derives property rights from natural law rather than collective consent or sovereign grant. Locke emphasized that such appropriation benefits humankind by encouraging productive use of resources.

==== Nozick's entitlement theory ====
Robert Nozick extended Lockean ideas in Anarchy, State, and Utopia (1974) through his entitlement theory of justice in holdings. According to Nozick, a distribution of property is just if it arises from a history of just acquisitions (following something like the Lockean process) and voluntary transfers, or through rectification of past injustices. This historical, procedural approach rejects "patterned" or end-state principles of distributive justice (whether utilitarian, egalitarian, or needs-based), because realizing such patterns would require continuous interference with individuals' rights to their legitimately acquired holdings. Nozick argued that respecting the separateness of persons imposes deontological side-constraints against using some people merely as means to others' ends.

==== Rothbard's non-aggression principles ====
Later libertarian thinkers built on these foundations. Murray Rothbard, in The Ethics of Liberty (1982), treated self-ownership as an axiomatic starting point and derived the non-aggression principle from it. Original appropriation occurs through homesteading: first use, occupation, or transformation of unowned resources, without requiring others' consent. Rothbard viewed property rights in external objects as the logical extension of self-ownership and the foundation of a consistent ethic of liberty.

=== Hoppe's argumentation ethics theory ===
Hans-Herman Hoppe has further elaborated these ideas through argumentation ethics. Hoppe contended that any attempt to deny self-ownership or the validity of private property in the course of rational argumentation leads to a performative contradiction, because argumentation itself presupposes the right to control one's body and the resources one has homesteaded. These frameworks support strong, near-absolute protections for private property and are often invoked in critiques of eminent domain, broad taxation viewed as non-consensual taking, and certain regulatory regimes.

=== Other ===
- First possession theory of property
- Labor theory of property

== See also ==
- Adverse possession
- Alienation (property law)
- Bundle of rights
- Common ownership
- Commons
- Economic system
- Homestead principle
- Intellectual property
- Land claim
- Land tenure
- Land titling
- Law and economics
- Means of production
- Natural and legal rights
- Open-access
- Personal property
- Public property
- Private property
- Property income
- Right to property
- Social ownership
- Squatting
- State ownership
- Taxation as theft
- Terra nullius
