= The Lighthouse in Economics =

1974 academic paper by Ronald Coase

"The Lighthouse in Economics" is a 1974 academic paper written by British economist Ronald H. Coase, the 1991 recipient of the Nobel Memorial Prize in Economic Sciences.

This paper challenges the traditional view in economics that lighthouses are public goods, and more specifically the prevailing consensus that the private construction and operation of lighthouses was not feasible - an argument that had first been formally raised by John Stuart Mill in his book Principles of Political Economy, 1848

Coase's arguments are based on the experiences of Britain from the 17th to 19th centuries. Coase aligned lighthouses more with club goods because they are excludable by way of charging port fees. While some characterize the paper as discursive, it is generally viewed—for example, see Posner (1993)—as providing insight into the dimensions of public goods.

The paper has been criticized by Van Zandt (1993), Bertrand (2006) and others for not fully appreciating the characteristic of non-excludability of public goods. Historical records showed that those lighthouses which ran on voluntary payment did not survive long and eventually had to be granted the right to collect a light due by the government. However, in the British case, Coase argues that private lighthouses did not survive, not because they were insolvent, but rather because of deliberate policy initiatives. The British government ordered that the private lighthouses be purchased by Trinity House (an association which Coase and other writers implicitly view as an arm of the British government, at least with respect to lighthouse provision). Coase notes that some of the lighthouses sold for what would, in today's values, be many millions of dollars.

Although many lighthouses were depicted by Coase as privately operated, the right to collect non-negotiable light dues was supported by a patent from the crown. In other words, they were not privately provided via the free market as understood by the earlier writers. Some have contended that government support was so pronounced that it is misleading to portray these lighthouses as private.

In a 1997 interview with Reason Magazine, Coase pushes back against such criticisms:

[I]f you look into what actually happens you discover that there's a long period in which lighthouses were provided by private enterprise. They were financed by private people, they were built by private people, they were operated by the people who had the rights to the lighthouses, which they could bequeath to others and sell. Some have said what happened in lighthouses wasn't really private enterprise. The government was involved in some way in setting the rights and so on. I think that's humbug because you could say that there's no private property in houses by that logic, since you can't transfer your rights to a house without the examination of title and registration and without obeying a whole series of regulations, many enforced by government.

Critics have maintained that these rights (to collect light dues etc.) were withdrawn or the lighthouses were bought up by the authorities because the total light dues paid by ships were inflated as a result of rent-seeking activities by lighthouse operators. In his article, Coase, however, suggests that the impetus for nationalizing the lighthouse industry arose from shipping interests, who preferred that the costs of providing lighthouses be shifted away from shippers, who directly benefited from the service, and towards British taxpayers more generally.

== See also ==
- Club good
- Public good
- Rivalry (economics)
