= Information economics =

Branch of microeconomics

Information economics or the economics of information is the branch of microeconomics that studies how information and information systems affect an economy and economic decisions.

One application considers information embodied in certain types of commercial products that are "expensive to produce but cheap to reproduce." Examples include computer software (e.g., Microsoft Windows), pharmaceuticals and technical books. Once information is recorded "on paper, in a computer, or on a compact disc, it can be reproduced and used by a second person essentially for free." Without the basic research, initial production of high-information commodities may be too unprofitable to market, a type of market failure. Government subsidization of basic research has been suggested as a way to mitigate the problem.

The subject of "information economics" is treated under Journal of Economic Literature classification code JEL D8 – Information, Knowledge, and Uncertainty. This article reflects topics included in that code. There are several subfields of information economics. Information as signal has been described as a kind of negative measure of uncertainty. It includes complete and scientific knowledge as special cases. The first insights in information economics related to the economics of information goods.

Since the 1970s, there have been influential advances in the study of information asymmetries and their implications for contract theory, including market failure as a possibility.

== Game theory ==
Information economics is formally related to game theory as two different types of games that may apply, including games with perfect information, complete information, and incomplete information. Experimental and game-theory methods have been developed to model and test theories of information economics, including potential public-policy applications such as mechanism design to elicit information-sharing and otherwise welfare-enhancing behavior.

An example of game theory in practice would be if two potential employees are going for the same promotion at work and are conversing with their employer about the job. However, one employee may have more information about what the role would entail than the other. Whilst the less informed employee may be willing to accept a lower pay rise for the new job, the other may have more knowledge on what the role's hours and commitment would take and would expect a higher pay. This is a clear use of incomplete information to give one person the advantage in a given scenario. If they talk about the promotion with each other in a process called colluding there may be the expectation that both will have equally informed knowledge about the job. However the employee with more information may mis-inform the other one about the value of the job for the work that is involved and make the promotion appear less appealing and hence not worth it. This brings into action the incentives behind information economics and highlights non-cooperative games.

== Value of information ==
The starting point for economic analysis is the observation that information has economic value because it allows individuals to make choices that yield higher expected payoffs or expected utility than they would obtain from choices made in the absence of information. Data valuation is an emerging discipline that seeks to understand and measure the economic characteristics of information and data.

== Information, price mechanism and organizations ==
Much of the literature in information economics was originally inspired by Friedrich Hayek's "The Use of Knowledge in Society" on the uses of the price mechanism in allowing information decentralization to order the effective use of resources. Although Hayek's work was intended to discredit the effectiveness of central planning agencies over a free market system, his proposal that price mechanisms communicate information about scarcity of goods inspired Abba Lerner, Tjalling Koopmans, Leonid Hurwicz, George Stigler and others to further develop the field of information economics. Next to market coordination through the price mechanism, transactions can also be executed within organizations. The information requirements of the transaction are the prime determinant for the actual (mix of) coordination mechanism(s) that we will observe.

== Information asymmetry ==
Information asymmetry means that the parties in the interaction have different information, e.g. one party has more or better information than the other. Expecting the other side to have better information can lead to a change in behavior. The less informed party may try to prevent the other from taking advantage of him. This change in behavior may cause inefficiency. Examples of this problem are selection (adverse or advantageous) and moral hazard.

Adverse selection occurs when one side of the partnership has information the other does not and this can occur deliberately or by accident due to poor communication. A classic paper on adverse selection is George Akerlof's The Market for Lemons.

The most common example of the Lemons Market is in the automobile industry. As suggested by Akerlof, there are four car types that a buyer could consider. This includes choosing either a new or used car, and choosing a good or bad car, or Lemon as it is more commonly known. When considering the market options there is possibility of purchasing a new lemon car as there is a used good car. The uncertainty that arises from the probability of purchasing a lemon due to asymmetric information can cause the buyer to have doubts about the car's quality and inherent outcome when purchased. This same dilemma exists in a multitude of markets where sellers have an incentive to not disclose information about their product if it is poor quality due to knowledge that the average standard across the industry from good products existing will boost their selling power. The asymmetrical information known about the car's quality can lead to a breakdown in the automobile industry's overall efficiency. This is due to two reasons. Firstly, uncertainty between the buyers and sellers and secondly in the broader market where only sellers with below average vehicles will be willing to sell due to the reduced quality being represented. There are two primary solutions for adverse selection; signaling and screening.

Moral hazard includes a partnership between a principal and agent and occurs when the agent may change their behaviour or actions after a contract has been finalised which can cause adverse consequences for the principal.

Moral hazard is present when there is a change in the agent's behaviour after taking out insurance cover to protect them. For example, if someone purchased car insurance for their vehicle and afterwards held their responsibility to a lower standard by going over the speed limit for example or generally driving recklessly. The 2008 financial crisis is another example, where Mortgage-backed securities were formed through the collation of subprime mortgages and sold to investors without disclosing the risk involved. For moral hazard, contracting between principal and agent may be describable as a second best solution where payoffs alone are observable with information asymmetry. Insurance covers will often include a waiting period clause to refrain agents from changing their attitude.

=== Signaling ===
Michael Spence originally proposed the idea of signaling. He proposed that in a situation with information asymmetry, it is possible for people to signal their type, thus credibly transferring information to the other party and resolving the asymmetry.

This idea was originally studied in the context of looking for a job. An employer is interested in hiring a new employee who is skilled in learning. Of course, all prospective employees will claim to be skilled at learning, but only they know if they really are. This is an information asymmetry.

Spence proposed that going to college can function as a credible signal of an ability to learn. Assuming that people who are skilled in learning can finish college more easily than people who are unskilled, then by attending college the skilled people signal their skill to prospective employers. This is true even if they didn't learn anything in school, and school was there solely as a signal. This works because the action they took (going to school) was easier for people who possessed the skill that they were trying to signal (a capacity for learning).

=== Screening ===
Joseph E. Stiglitz pioneered the theory of screening. In this way the underinformed party can induce the other party to reveal their information. They can provide a menu of choices in such a way that the optimal choice of the other party depends on their private information. By making a particular choice, the other party reveals that he has information that makes that choice optimal. For example, an amusement park wants to sell more expensive tickets to customers who value their time more and money more than other customers. Asking customers their willingness to pay will not work - everyone will claim to have low willingness to pay. But the park can offer a menu of priority and regular tickets, where priority allows skipping the line at rides and is more expensive. This will induce the customers with a higher value of time to buy the priority ticket and thereby reveal their type.

== Risk and uncertainty of information ==
Fluctuations in the availability and accuracy of information can induce some level of risk and uncertainty.

Risk is defined by the circumstances under which the probability of every outcome is known by the decision-making individual and that, among all possible outcomes, it is not fully certain which will occur. In contrast, uncertainty refers to the situation whereby the probability of every outcome is unknown and cannot be accurately estimated thus, individuals will often lack sufficient economic information to make an informed decision.

Risk attitude directly influences the behaviour of economic agents during decision-making under uncertainty by altering the individuals' perception towards the valuation and reliability of information within the market. Stakeholders, particularly managers, will often demonstrate different risk attitudes which dictate their decision-making towards a variety of investments.

Risk attitude is classified under three main categories: risk aversion, risk neutrality and risk-seeking dispositions.

Risk-averse managers have a tendency to prefer investments with a low degree of uncertainty that generates relatively lower expected returns, as opposed to those with a high degree of uncertainty that generates relatively higher expected returns. They are more likely to choose a decision with a guaranteed outcome that has minimal risk, even if that meant foregoing a payoff that is potentially higher.

Risk-neutral managers primarily focus on maximising the expected outcome irrespective of the level of risk. This indifference fuels their inclination to pursue risky investment decisions only if the potential payoff was greater than the potential losses. While, risk-seeking managers have the tendency to prefer investments with the highest potential return, even if that decision meant undertaking a higher degree of risk.

== Information goods ==
Buying and selling information is not the same as buying and selling most other goods. There are three factors that make the economics of buying and selling information different from solid goods:

First of all, information is non-rivalrous, which means consuming information does not exclude someone else from also consuming it. A related characteristic that alters information markets is that information has almost zero marginal cost. This means that once the first copy exists, it costs nothing or almost nothing to make a second copy. This makes it easy to sell over and over. However, it makes classic marginal cost pricing completely infeasible.

Second, exclusion is not a natural property of information goods, though it is possible to construct exclusion artificially. However, the nature of information is that if it is known, it is difficult to exclude others from its use. Since information is likely to be both non-rivalrous and non-excludable, it is frequently considered an example of a public good.

Third is that the information market does not exhibit high degrees of transparency. That is, to evaluate the information, the information must be known, so you have to invest in learning it to evaluate it. To evaluate a bit of software you have to learn to use it; to evaluate a movie you have to watch it.

The importance of these properties is explained by De Long and Froomkin in The Next Economy.

== Network effects ==
Carl Shapiro and Hal Varian described Network effect (also called network externalities) as products gaining additional value from each additional user of that good or service. Network effects are externalities in which they provide an immediate benefit when an additional user joins the network, increasing the network size. The total value of the network depends upon the total adopters but carries only a marginal benefit for new users. This leads to a direct network effect for each user's adoption of the good, with an increased incentive for adoption as other user's adopt and join the network. The indirect network effect occurs as a complementary goods benefit from the adoption of the initial product.

The growth of data is constantly expanding and growing at an exponential rate, however, the application of this data is far lower than the creation of it.

New data brings about a potential increase in misleading or inaccurate information which can crowd out the correct information. This increase in unverified information is due to the easy and free nature of creating online data, disrupting potential for users from finding sourced and verified data.

=== Critical mass ===
As new networks are developed, early adopters form the social dynamics of the greater population and develop product maturity known as Critical mass. Product maturity is when they become self-sustaining and is more likely to occur when there are positive cash flows, consistent revenue flows, customer retention and brand engagement. To form a following, low initial prices need to be offered, along with widespread marketing to help create the snowball effect.

== More information ==
In 2001, the Nobel prize in economics was awarded to George Akerlof, Michael Spence, and Joseph E. Stiglitz "for their analyses of markets with asymmetric information".

== See also ==
- Adverse selection
- Contract theory
- Game theory
- Indigo Era (economics)
- Information economy
- Moral hazard
- Product bundling
- Screening
- Signaling
- Single-crossing condition
