= O Comércio da Póvoa de Varzim =

Portuguese local newspaper

O Comércio da Póvoa de Varzim, founded in 1903, was one of the three main local newspapers of Póvoa de Varzim, Portugal. Unlike its rivals, Póvoa Semanário and A Voz da Póvoa, the paper was devoted to national and local news alike.

The newspaper final issue was published on 22 December 2011.
