= The Kosovo Times =

- Company type: Independent
- Industry: News agency
- Headquarters: Pristina, Kosovo
- Owner: Multiple NGOs
- Website: www.kosovotimes.net

The Kosovo Times was an English-language website news journal published between May and September 2009 in Pristina, Kosovo. It published news and regional news about Kosovo and the Balkans, and provided interviews and analyses on Kosovo. It used the slogan "Kosovo's leading electronic news journal".

The Kosovo Times was founded by several local Non Governmental Organisations, primarily by 'The Kosovo Arab Chamber for Friendship and Cooperation'.

Original logo during early 2009
