= Information good =

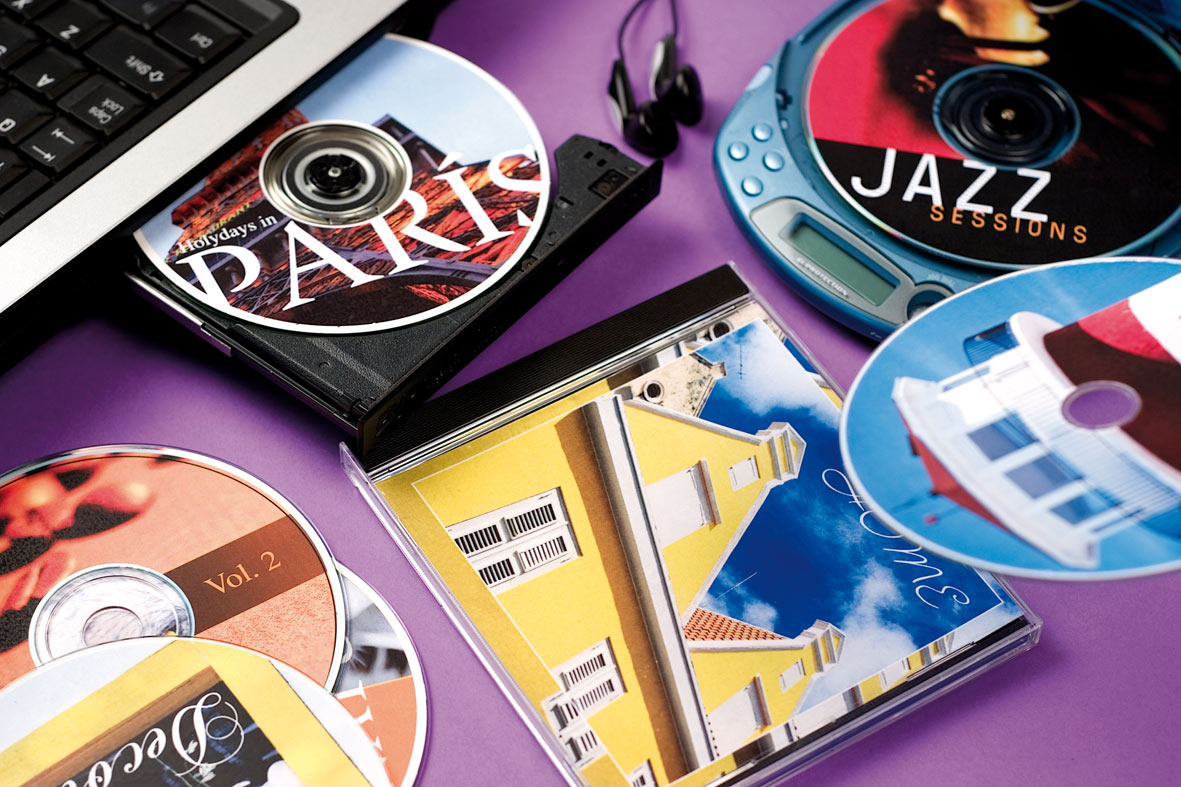
CDs can carry multimedia information goods, including sound, data and video

Information goods are commodities that provide value to consumers through the data or signs or other content, such as pictures, music or other sounds, that it contains and refers to any good or service that can be digitalized. Examples of information goods includes books, journals, computer software, music and videos. Information goods can be copied, shared, resold or rented. Information goods are durable goods and thus, will not be destroyed through consumption.

As information goods have distinct characteristics as they are experience goods, have returns to scale and are non-rivalrous, the laws of supply and demand that depend on the scarcity of products do not frequently apply to information goods. As a result, the buying and selling of information goods differs from ordinary goods. Information goods are goods whose unit production costs (including distribution costs) are negligible compared to their amortized development costs.

Well-informed companies have development costs that increase with product quality, but their unit cost is zero. Once an information commodity has been developed, other units can be produced and distributed at almost zero cost. For example, allow downloads over the Internet. Conversely, for industrial goods, the unit cost of production and distribution usually dominates. Firms with an industrial advantage do not incur any development costs, but unit costs increase as product quality improves.

== Common trading models ==
There are two common trading methods in information goods trading: the leasing model and selling model. Providers of information goods and services are increasingly adopting leasing models. With the leasing model, the user does not own the information good or service permanently but leases it from the provider and pays a fixed fee on a regular basis. For example, mobile music applications. Consumers pay monthly for listening rights to all songs on the platform. With the selling model, after payment is prepaid, consumers can use it unlimited times. For example, with video games from game companies, consumers can play the game regardless of the time any number of times after purchasing a game disc or network license.

== Disadvantages ==
Piracy is an important issue facing information service providers. A report from the U.S. Government Accountability Office states that counterfeiting and piracy have a wide-ranging impact on consumers, industries, governments and the economy. Generally, it depends on the type of infringement involved and other factors. These include lost sales, lost tax revenue, damaged brand value, and reduced incentives to innovate. For example, the software industry may be one of the hardest hit. In 2011, the piracy rate of US software products was about 20%. That alone cost the American software maker a whopping $9.5 million in lost revenue.

In addition, social sharing of information goods involves buying and sharing a single good through a network of acquaintances such as friends or colleagues is also an important issue for suppliers of these goods. When customers buy an information good and send it to their friends or colleagues. The person who receives it does not need to buy it again. Although these actions do not involve piracy, it affects the sale of information goods.

== Bundling strategy ==
Although information goods can be copied in large numbers and sold after completion. But it can also be shared by customers who have already purchased it. Despite the growth of the Internet, the profits of information products will only decrease. As a result, producers started bundling. Bakos & Brynjolfsson (1999) found that bundling large numbers of unrelated information goods can be surprisingly profitable because the law of large numbers makes it much easier to predict the value consumers place on bundled goods than if they were sold individually.

== Versioning strategy ==
Versioning is a method of implementing second-degree price discrimination through varying the quality of a product. For example, a music software company may offer a "student version" of its software with fewer features at a lower price and a "professional version" with more features at a higher price. This approach is particularly advantageous when it is not costly to downgrade an information good to create one or more lower quality versions. Versioning involves a corporation offering its product in various versions and allowing customers to choose the one that suits them best. The goal for the corporation is to minimize expenses while meeting customer requirements as precisely as possible and matching the requested price to customers' willingness to pay. For information goods providers, producing different versions is relatively easy and cost-effective, especially for established products like a mail program or a communications portal.

However, it is important to determine how many versions to offer. While it is theoretically possible to produce an individual version for each customer at a low versioning cost and achieve complete price discrimination, having too many product versions can be confusing for customers. The market should be able to easily distinguish between the performance differences of the versions to make informed purchasing decisions The best way to version information goods depends heavily on their network externalities.

However, even for products that have significant externalities, the decision to version should also consider other factors such as how exclusive the network is and the costs involved in versioning Typically, vendors in proprietary networks benefit more from versioning than those in shared networks. For products that follow open standards or are compatible with other competing brands, vendors may consider reducing their versioning activities as it may not produce the desired benefits.

== Economic theory ==
Information economics refers to a microeconomic theory that studies how information affects economic activities. An information marketplace differs from the market place of ordinary goods as information goods are not actually consumed and can be reproduced and distributed at a very low marginal cost. The unique characteristics of information goods complicate many standard economic theories.

Economic theories on information goods face the problem of dealing with two contradictory concepts. On one hand, information is regarded as an important economic resource for development as perfect information is a key requirement of the efficient-market hypothesis. As a result, complete information should be accessible and made available to everyone at no cost. However, actual markets often depend on information as a commodity, resulting in information goods. If information is a commodity, it will be potentially restricted in terms of access, cost, availability and completeness and thus, not be freely available.

== Market failure ==
Information goods have a number of characteristics that contribute to market failure. Information goods have very high fixed costs of production but can be reproduced with zero or very low marginal cost which can cause difficulties in competitive markets. Improvements in digital technology have also allowed information goods to be easily reproduced and distributed. For example, it can cost over a hundred million dollars to produce a movie, while the movie can easily be recorded in the cinema or online and distributed inexpensively. Furthermore, information goods typically incur sunk costs which are not recoverable. While there are copyright and piracy laws making it illegal for consumers to copy and distribute information goods, it is often difficult to detect copying and distributing activities which makes it hard for authorities to prevent the illegal distribution of information goods.

As information goods are experience goods, consumers may be reluctant to purchase them as they are unable to accurately assess the utility they would gain from the good before purchasing it. As a result, information goods can suffer from adverse selection and result in a type of market failure known as the lemon problem, which is where the quality of the goods traded in the market can decrease due to asymmetric information between a buyer and seller.

Information goods are also public goods meaning that they are non-rival and sometimes non-excludable. This is because one person’s consumption of an information good does not reduce other people’s enjoyment of the same good or diminish the amount available to other people. Additionally, a person generally cannot exclude others from consuming an information good.

== Methods to overcome market failure ==
Producers of information goods can engage in a number of strategies to address the market failure that arises. In order to address the market failure that arises as a result of information goods being experience goods, producers can provide consumers with previews so that they can partially experience the good prior to purchasing it. For example, movie producers will often release a movie trailer and synopsis so that consumers know what the movie is about before they watch it which influences their likelihood of purchasing the good. Another way producers of information goods overcome the experience good problem is through reviews. By reading reviews and testimonials on information goods, consumers can determine the quality of an information good and know what it is before purchasing it. Additionally, to prevent market failure, producers can establish and maintain their brand reputation. This is because if an information good has a well-established brand reputation, consumers will be inclined to purchase it even if they are unable to determine how much satisfaction they will gain from the good before experiencing it.

In order to prevent consumers from copying and distributing information goods, copyright and piracy laws make it illegal for consumers to copy and reproduce goods that they did not produce. Laws and regulations address the market failure that occurs due to information goods having returns to scale by imposing penalties on individuals who illegally reproduce information goods which prevents them from doing so.

== See also ==
- Digital Public Goods
- Intellectual property
- Information economics
- Digital Millennium Copyright Act
- File sharing
- Information asymmetry
- Market failure
