= Privileged =

Privileged may refer to:

== Film and television ==
- Privileged (TV series), a 2008 US television series
- Privileged (film), a 1982 Hollywood film

== Other uses ==
- Immunologically privileged site, a body location where immune response to antigens is non-destructive or suppressed
- Privileged motion, a motion of parliamentary procedure
- Privileged group, an economics term
- Privileged pattern, a musical motive, figure, or chord which is repeated and transposed
- Referring to a season of the Catholic Church's and other Christian churches' liturgical years besides Ordinary Time (Easter, Christmas, Lent, Advent)

== See also ==
- Privilege (disambiguation)
