= Diluted property rights theory =

Macroeconomics theory

Diluted property rights theory is a macroeconomics theory proposed by founder of Holland Meissner Company, Amber Persons (formerly known as Monica Lester). The theory is meant to serve as an extension of property rights theory. Property rights theory has not received substantial theoretical or empirical attention despite its potential to explain various phenomena dealing with business transactions. Diluted property rights theory addresses this lack of progression by approaching property rights theory from the position of approximating the conditions that actually exist when rights are negotiated, exchanged, and handled.

This is the same approach that Nobel Prize winner Ronald Coase took when discovering and clarifying the significance of property rights. While property rights theory defines property rights and delineates how the rightful owner of such rights may use, enforce, transfer, and benefit from them, diluted property rights theory attempts to define a pervasive violation of a principal of property rights theory. Writing from a legal perspective, Coase explains how property rights should be delimited. According to Coase, such rights should go to the party that can create the most public benefit. However, property rights are often diluted and the party that can create the most public good are not always granted such rights.

Diluted property rights are created when:

1. Rights are not well-defined
2. Rights are weakened due to some legal or socially accepted event
3. The diluting event is mediating
4. The diluting event has a significant and/or reprehensive impact
5. The diluting event interferes with the use, transfer, enforcement, or residual claim deriving from ownership of the property right

The theory holds that the event need not be reoccurring to make a lasting impression. In addition, diluted property rights are not extended to incidental violation of the law that reaves a rightful owner of his rights. Diluted property rights theory is concerned with widespread weakening of rights that are dictated by policy, law, and norms. The concern is that the continued weakening of property rights will have long-lasting wide spread effects that may be disadvantageous to the world economy. This concern is valid in so much as well protected property rights have created long-lasting benefits to corporations.

== Prior approaches to diluted property rights ==
Diluted property rights have often been approached as a minor topic in traditional business research. For example, in his book Internal Research & Development Markets, Eric Kasper offered two examples of how rights can be diluted: 1) the exploitation of R & D results by a business unit, and 2) the simultaneous sharing of rights by several individuals. However, in trademark law, dilution from a legal and intellectual rights perspective is well-documented.

== Books ==
LesterMoney: Latest and Greatest Business Research in Layman's Terms. ISBN 978-0692762547
