= It's Your Call with Lynn Doyle =

Call-in show

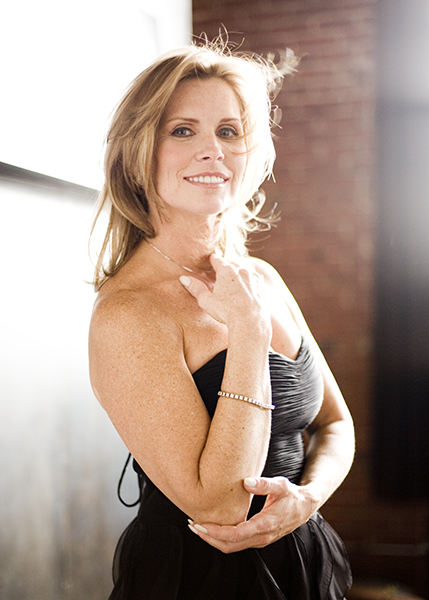
Lynn Doyle, host of It's Your Call, 2007

It's Your Call with Lynn Doyle is a local-issue-focused call-in show broadcast in the Philadelphia TV market area on CN8. Guests include experts, pundits, and politicians from Philadelphia, surrounding counties and southern New Jersey. Topics are usually local government stories or any local news, though national news stories are sometimes included.

The show has won the Boston / New England regional Emmy award in the interview/discussion program category for seven times, including the latest round in 2007.
