= Póvoa Semanário =

- Type: Weekly local newspaper
- Format: Tabloid
- Owner(s): Virtual Povoense Editora, Lda.
- Editor: Catarina Pessanha
- Headquarters: Póvoa de Varzim
- Website: www.povoasemanario.pt

Póvoa Semanário is one of the three main local newspapers of Póvoa de Varzim, Portugal.

Its current editor-in-chief is Catarina Pessanha.
