= Privileged group =

In economics, a privileged group is one possible condition for the production of public goods.

A privileged group contains at least one individual that benefits more from a public good than its production costs. Therefore, the good will be produced although other members of the group benefit without paying. However, this free rider problem may still result in an undersupply of the good compared to the Lindahl equilibrium.

== Resources ==
- Olson, Mancur (1965). The Logic of Collective Action: Public Goods and the Theory of Groups (1st ed.). Harvard University Press. ISBN 0-674-53751-3.

== See also ==
- Public good (economics)
- Collective action
