= Common-pool resource =

Type of good in economics

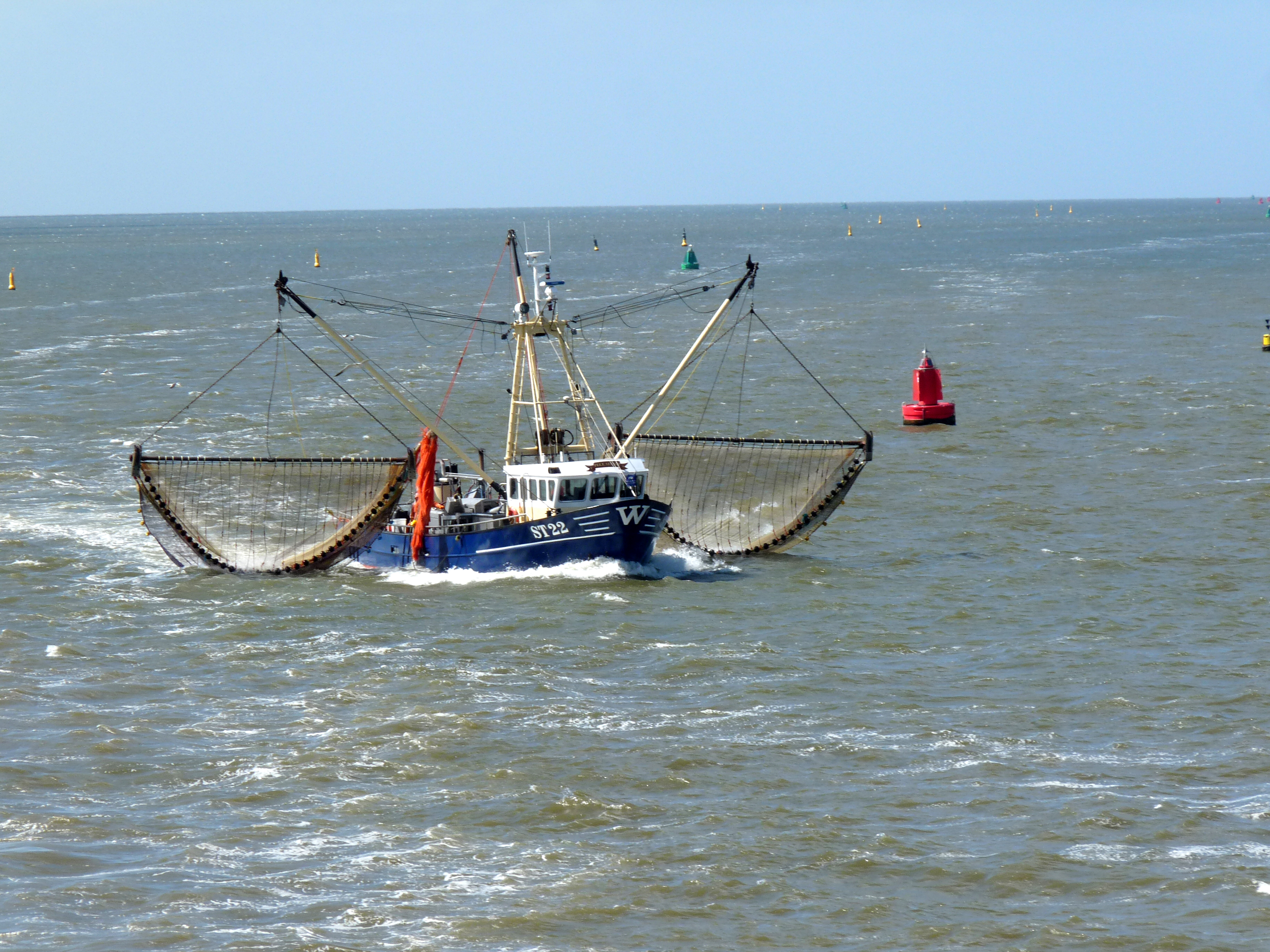
Fish stocks in a fishing ground are considered common-pool resources.

In economics, a common-pool resource (CPR) is a type of good consisting of a natural or human-made resource system (e.g. an irrigation system or fishing grounds), whose size or characteristics makes it costly, but not impossible, to exclude potential beneficiaries from obtaining benefits from its use. Unlike pure public goods, common pool resources face problems of congestion or overuse, because they are subtractable. A common-pool resource typically consists of a core resource (e.g., water or fish), which defines the stock variable, while providing a limited quantity of extractable fringe units, which defines the flow variable. While the core resource is to be protected or nurtured in order to allow for its continuous exploitation, the fringe units can be harvested or consumed.

== Examples of common-pool resources ==
Common-pool goods are typically regulated and nurtured in order to prevent demand from overwhelming supply and allow for their continued exploitation. Examples of common-pool resources include forests, man-made irrigation systems, fishing grounds, and groundwater basins. For instance, fishermen have an incentive to harvest as many fish as possible because if they do not, someone else will—so without management and regulation, fish stocks soon become depleted. And while a river might supply many cities with drinking water, manufacturing plants might be tempted to pollute the river if they were not prohibited from doing so by law because someone else would bear the costs. In California, where there is a huge demand for surface water but supplies are limited, common pool problems are exacerbated because the state does not manage groundwater basins at the state level. During the 2012-2016 drought, farmers with senior water rights dating back to the 19th century could use as much water as they wanted, while cities and towns had to make drastic cutbacks to water use.

In James Bay, Quebec, the beaver was an important species for food and later commerce when the fur trade started in 1670. Amerindian groups in the area have traditionally used resources communally and have a heritage of customary laws to regulate hunting. However, in the 1920s the railroads caused a large influx of non-native trappers who took advantage of the high fur prices and the indigenous people losing control of their territories. Both non-native and native trappers contributed to the decline of the beaver population, prompting conservation laws to be enacted after 1930 and outsiders being banned from trapping in James Bay. Eventually, Amerindian communities and family territories were legally recognized, and customary laws became enforceable. This restoration of local control allowed for the beaver population to recover.

Since 1947, the Maine lobster catch has been remarkably stable despite predictions of resource collapse. The state government has regulations in place but does not limit the number of licenses. The exclusion to this CPR is done through a system of traditional fishing rights which makes it so that one needs to be accepted by the community to be able to go lobster fishing. Those in a community are restricted to fishing in the territory held by that community. This is enforced by surreptitious violence towards interlopers. Fishermen in these exclusive territories catch significantly more and larger lobsters with less effort than those in areas where territories overlap.

In the New York Bight region, a cooperative of trawl fishermen that specializes in harvesting whiting limits entry into the local fishery and establishes catch quotas among members. These quotas are based on regional market sales estimations and attempt to encourage initiative while discouraging “free-riding.” They limit entry to the whiting grounds and markets through a closed membership policy and by controlling the dock space. Due to these methods, they have access to the best whiting grounds, dominate the market during winter, and can maintain relatively high prices through supply management. The fishermen consider this type of self-regulation both flexible and effective in maintaining sustainable use.

Reduction of government debt and the debt-to-GDP ratio is a common-pool resource, which can be connected to deficit spending.

== Common property systems ==
A common property rights regime system (not to be confused with a common-pool resource) is a particular social arrangement regulating the preservation, maintenance, and consumption of a common-pool resource. The use of the term "common property resource" to designate a type of good has been criticized, because common-pool resources are not necessarily governed by common property protocols. Examples of common-pool resources include irrigation systems, fishing grounds, pastures, forests, water or the atmosphere. A pasture, for instance, allows for a certain amount of grazing to occur each year without the core resource being harmed. In the case of excessive grazing, however, the pasture may become more prone to erosion and eventually yield less benefit to its users. Because the core resources are vulnerable, common-pool resources are generally subject to problems of congestion, overuse, pollution, and potential destruction unless harvesting or use limits are devised and enforced.

Resource systems like pastoral areas, fishing grounds, forest areas are storage variables. Under favorable conditions, they can maximize the flow without harming the total storage volume and the entire resource system. Different from the resource system, the resource unit is the amount that an individual occupies or uses from the resource system, such as the total amount of fish caught in a fishing ground, the amount of feed consumed by livestock in pastoral areas. A resource system allows multiple people or enterprise to produce at the same time, and the process of using common-pool resources can be performed simultaneously by multiple occupants. However, the resource unit cannot be used by multiple people or enterprises at the same time.

== Management ==
The use of many common-pool resources, if managed carefully, can be extended because the resource system forms a negative feedback loop, where the stock variable continually regenerates the fringe variable as long as the stock variable is not compromised, providing an optimum amount of consumption. However, consumption exceeding the fringe value reduces the stock variable, which in turn decreases the flow variable. If the stock variable is allowed to regenerate then the fringe and flow variables may also recover to initial levels, but in many cases the loss is irreparable.

== Ownership ==
Common-pool resources may be owned by national, regional or local governments as public goods, by communal groups as common property resources, or by private individuals or corporations as private goods. When they are owned by no one, they are used as open access resources. Having observed a number of common pool resources throughout the world, Elinor Ostrom noticed that a number of them are governed by common property protocols — arrangements different from private property or state administration — based on self-management by a local community. Her observations contradict claims that common-pool resources must be privatized or else face destruction in the long run due to collective action problems leading to the overuse of the core resource (see also Tragedy of the commons).

== Definition matrix ==
	Excludable	Non-excludable
Rivalrous	Private goods eg. food, clothing, parking spaces	Common-pool resources eg. fish stocks, timber
Non-rivalrous	Club goods eg. cinemas, software, private parks	Public goods eg. free-to-air television, air, national defense

== Common property protocols ==
Common property systems of management arise when users acting independently threaten the total net benefit from common-pool resource. In order to maintain the resources, protocols coordinate strategies to maintain the resource as a common property instead of dividing it up into parcels of private property. Common property systems typically protect the core resource and allocate the fringe resources through complex community norms of consensus decision-making. Common resource management has to face the difficult task of devising rules that limit the amount, timing, and technology used to withdraw various resource units from the resource system. Setting the limits too high would lead to overuse and eventually to the destruction of the core resource while setting the limits too low would unnecessarily reduce the benefits obtained by the users.

In common property systems, access to the resource is not free and common-pool resources are not public goods. While there is relatively free but monitored access to the resource system for community members, there are mechanisms in place which allow the community to exclude outsiders from using its resource. Thus, in a common property state, a common-pool resource appears as a private good to an outsider and as a common good to an insider of the community. The resource units withdrawn from the system are typically owned individually by the appropriators. A common property good is rivaled in consumption.

Analysing the design of long-enduring CPR institutions, Elinor Ostrom identified eight design principles which are prerequisites for a stable CPR arrangement:

1. Clearly defined boundaries
2. Congruence between appropriation and provision rules and local conditions
3. Collective-choice arrangements allowing for the participation of most of the appropriators in the decision making process
4. Effective monitoring by monitors who are part of or accountable to the appropriators
5. Graduated sanctions for appropriators who do not respect community rules
6. Conflict-resolution mechanisms which are cheap and easy to access
7. Minimal recognition of rights to organize (e.g., by the government)
8. In case of larger CPRs: Organisation in the form of multiple layers of nested enterprises, with small, local CPRs at their bases.

Common property systems typically function at a local level to prevent the overexploitation of a resource system from which fringe units can be extracted. In some cases, government regulations combined with tradable environmental allowances (TEAs) are used successfully to prevent excessive pollution, whereas in other cases — especially in the absence of a unique government being able to set limits and monitor economic activities — excessive use or pollution continue.

=== Adaptive governance ===
The management of common-pool resources is highly dependent upon the type of resource involved. An effective strategy at one location, or of one particular resource, may not be necessarily appropriate for another. In The Challenge of Common-Pool Resources, Ostrom makes the case for adaptive governance as a method for the management of common-pool resources. Adaptive governance is suited to dealing with problems that are complex, uncertain and fragmented, as is the management of common-pool resources. Ostrom outlines five basic protocol requirements for achieving adaptive governance. These include:

- Achieving accurate and relevant information, by focusing on the creation and use of timely scientific knowledge on the part of both the managers and the users of the resource
- Dealing with conflict, acknowledging the fact that conflicts will occur, and having systems in place to discover and resolve them as quickly as possible
- Enhancing rule compliance, through creating responsibility for the users of a resource to monitor usage
- Providing infrastructure, that is flexible over time, both to aid internal operations and create links to other resources
- Encouraging adaption and change to address errors and cope with new developments

== Influential factors in the management of common-pool resources ==
A new proposal of the management of CPR is to develop autonomous organizations that are not completely privatized and controlled by government power, which led and supervised by the community to manage common-pool resources in addition to directly through the government and the free market. There are many factors that may affect the formation and development of these kinds of autonomous organizations. Effectively identifying the influencing factors of the autonomous management system of CPRs increasing the feasibility of the system, and it is more conducive to the sustainable use of resources as well.

In general, there are four variables that are very important for local common-pool resource management: (1) characteristics of the resource; (2) characteristics of the resource-dependent group; (3) institutional model of resource management; (4) the relationship between groups, external forces, and authorities.

The government, market and interest groups are all considered as external forces that have an impact on CPR management system. Changes in market demand for CPR, in particular, technological innovation increases productivity and lowers costs, which undermines the sustainability of the management system. In order to develop more resources, resource owners may seek to change the ownership of resources in the form of cooperation with the government, privatize CPR or even cancel the protection of CPR ownership by regulations. Such institutional changes prevent the implementation of policies that are beneficial to the majority of the population, while the power of the government and bureaucracy can be abused.

The community is responsible for supervising and administering CPR under an autonomous management system, the characteristics of a community can affect how CPR is managed. (1) the size of the community. The level of cooperation decreases as the number of community members grows; (2) Allocation mechanism for CPR. Encouraging the exploitation of the least used resources and reducing the exploitation of the most used resources will effectively increase the rate of resource supply and reduce the rate of resource consumption and individual demand. (3) Group identity. When people in a community have a strong sense of group identity, it helps to manage CPR within the community.

== Open access resources ==
In economics, open access resources are, for the most part, rivalrous, non-excludable goods. This makes them similar to common goods during times of prosperity. Unlike many common goods, open access goods require little oversight or may be difficult to restrict access. However, as these resources are first come, first served, they may be affected by the phenomenon of the tragedy of the commons. Two possibilities may follow: a common property or an open access system.

However, in a different setting, such as fishing, there will be drastically different consequences. Since fish are an open access resource, it is relatively simple to fish and profit. If fishing becomes profitable, there will be more fishers and fewer fish. Fewer fish lead to higher prices which will lead again to more fishers, as well as lower reproduction of fish. This is a negative externality and an example of problems that arise with open access goods.

== See also ==
- Carrying capacity
- Common good (economics)
- Commons
- Enclosure
- Exploitation of natural resources
- Global commons
- Knowledge commons
- Occupancy-abundance relationship
- Overexploitation
- Tragedy of the commons
- Tyranny of small decisions
