= Local news =

Type of news dealing with local subjects

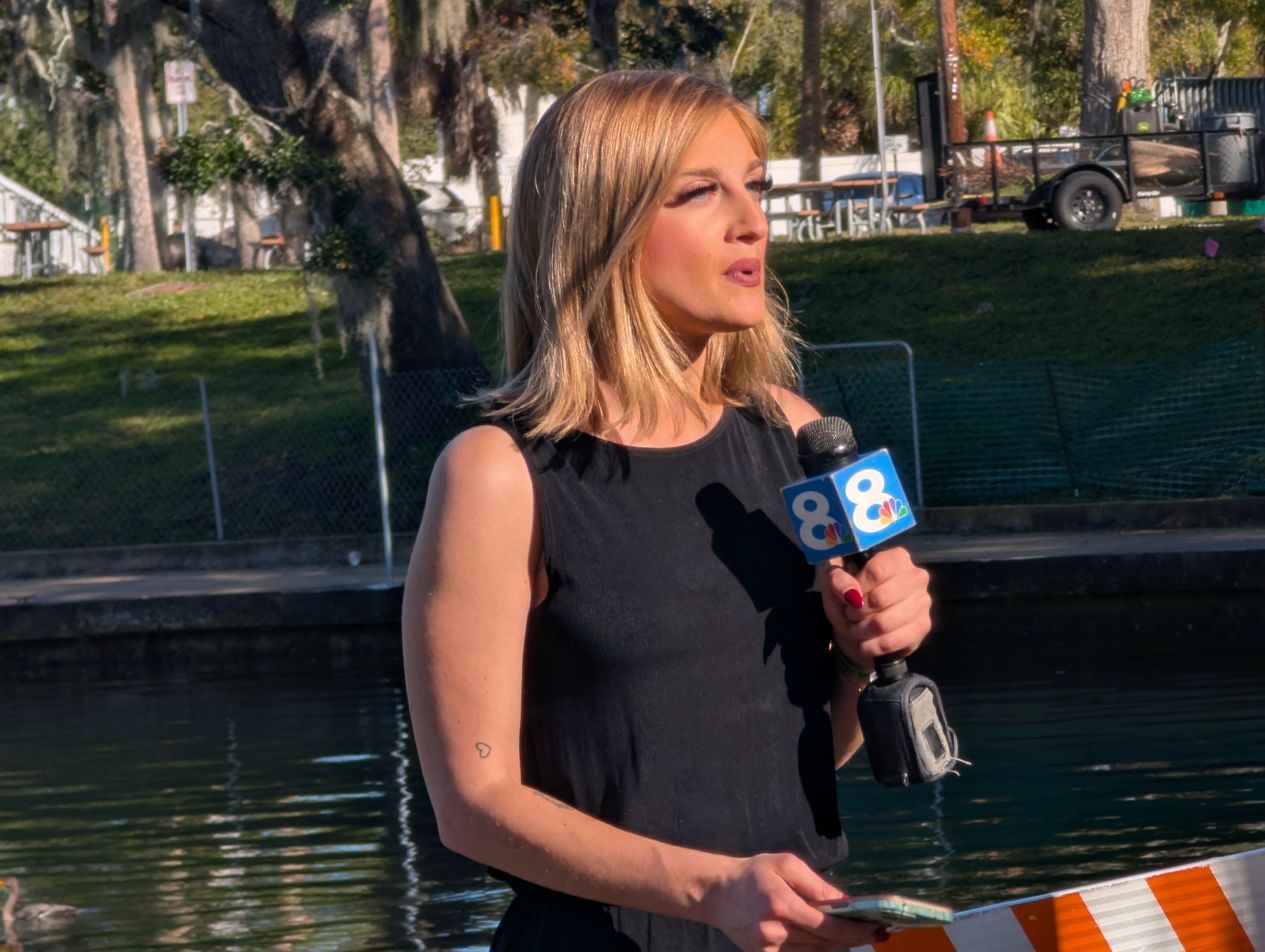
WFLA's Alessandra Young at Tarpon Springs

In journalism, local news covers events that would not be of interest to another locality, or otherwise be of national or international scope. It, in contrast to national or international news, caters to the interests of the local community and focuses on local events and issues. Some key features of local newsrooms include regional politics, weather, business, and human interest stories.

Local news readership has been declining in recent years, according to a recent study. As more and more television consumers tap into streamed programming, local news viewership is declining. Nikki Usher, an associate professor at the College of Media at the University of Illinois, argued in "The Complicated Future of Local News" that "critical and comprehensive local news is a recent invention, not a core element of the history of American democracy."

Conversely, citing Alexis de Tocqueville in the second volume of Democracy in America (1840), political scientist Robert D. Putnam noted in the first edition of Bowling Alone (2000) that differences between the Greatest Generation and the Silent Generation in the United States versus Baby boomers and Generation X in local civic association membership rates and various forms of civic and political engagement was significantly associated with generational differences in news consumption broadly and of newspaper subscriptions especially, such that Americans born before 1946 reported in a Yankelovich Partners survey at the end of the 20th century that they derived belongingness from local newspapers at more than twice the rate of Americans born after 1964.

== Television ==
Opt-outs of local television news are frequent before, during, or after national evening news television programming. Television networks can also commission or make provisions for local stations to produce longer standalone local news programs. Some local television markets/viewing areas within a country may even have a dedicated 24-hour local news channel. Local news stations have also started covering less and less local politics in favor of stories that they believe will garner more clicks or attention. A study has also shown that there has been less investigative journalism within local news stations in recent years.

=== Differences ===
Local news largely covers the following:

- local sports
- local crime and justice
- local weather
- local business and economy
- local events
- local education
- local politics
- local traffic updates (especially during morning and evening newscasts)

National and international news, however, tend to cover a wider range of content, including news concerning specialized institutions of wide-ranging international power or influence, such as:

- (inter)national political and intergovernmental events
- stock markets
- (inter)national sports competitions
- regional environmental events
- media/entertainment events
- science/technology events
- air traffic/aviator transport events
- defense/security events

=== Practices in each country ===
In the United States, local news is provided on local commercial broadcasting channels (some of which are television network affiliates). They can either be standalone newscasts that run for at least a half-hour or short segments that air attached to national morning newscasts approximately 25 and 55 minutes past the hour. As not all stations are owned and operated by a television network, the graphics, branding, and studio designs of a station's newscasts often differ from the network they are affiliated with although in recent years, affiliates have made some form of on-air reference to their corresponding networks in the branding of their newscasts. In addition, the local news departments of stations also superimpose their on-screen digital clocks, thermometers, and (occasionally) local news tickers on graphics provided by networks during morning network newscasts. Some cable channels are dedicated to local news coverage. Examples of this include NY1 in New York and WJLA 24/7 News (formerly NewsChannel 8) in the Washington, D.C. market.

In Canada, the commercial broadcasters such as CTV have regional morning newscasts. There is also a bloc in the late afternoon dedicated to regional news.

In the United Kingdom, most local news is provided on a local network station with similar branding and studio design to that of the national network news. Examples of this include the nationally networked BBC News and its regional news services such as BBC North West Tonight (on BBC North West) and BBC Newsline (on BBC Northern Ireland); the nationally networked ITV News and its regional stations including ITV Granada and UTV. The long version of BBC and ITV's local news shows often air during the 18:00 hour on weekday evenings. STV, which simulcasts most of the ITV network's programs in Scotland, is not owned and operated by ITV but has its own branded newscast that broadcasts Scottish-centred news at the same time as ITV's regional news services.

In Australia, local news for regional areas outside of major metropolitan cities is usually produced by local affiliate stations of the major television networks. Local affiliates of television networks Seven and Nine produce a total of twenty-six news bulletins across Queensland, New South Wales, Victoria, Tasmania, the Australian Capital Territory, and Western Australia. Each bulletin is half an hour long, and stories for the bulletin are usually produced from a local newsroom in a region, before being sent to a central broadcast studio for transmission, with one bulletin usually airing live. Seven uses studios in Maroochydore, Surfers Paradise, Canberra, and Bunbury for bulletins in Queensland, the Gold Coast, New South Wales/Victoria, and Western Australia respectively, whereas Nine's local affiliate WIN uses two broadcast centers in Wollongong and Maroochydore for its news bulletins. Each market also receives either a shortened edition of the nearest metropolitan bulletin or an in-house produced national news bulletin.

In France, most local news is aired on France Television's France 3. Additionally BFM TV also has a local news channel for the Ile-de-France region called BFM Paris.

In Germany, each regional public broadcaster shows a half-hour's worth of regional news at 19:30 Central European Time on channel 3.

Norway's public broadcaster, NRK1, airs a local news program called NRK Distriktsnyheter (name of the viewing area) every weekday evening at 18:45 Central European Time, just before the main national newscast Dagsrevyen. A replay of all local newscasts across the country is shown on NRK2 the following morning (Tuesday to Saturday).

Finland's public broadcaster (YLE) airs an eight-minute-long regional news bulletin at 18:21 Eastern European Time every weeknight on YLE1. The bulletins from all regions are replayed across the country the following day starting from 10:50 to 12:10 Eastern European Time on YLE1.

In Sweden, SVT's regional news is simply called SVT Nyheter (name of the viewing area) which shares the same branding as the network's main newscast, Rapport. Unlike SVT's counterparts in the US and UK, during morning programs, the local news opt-out airs in the middle of each half-hour. Since June 2017, the morning regional cut-ins no longer feature an in-studio presenter but instead show compiled short reports from various correspondents across the region. When SVT World was still airing, the simulcast of the morning program featured a different regional opt-out during each half-hour. A 13-minute standalone local newscast airs at 18:30 Central European Time each weekday evening after Sportnytt (SVT's sports news) on SVT1. Additionally, a short local news segment is incorporated into SVT's other evening newscast Aktuellt which airs on SVT2. In that case, this local news segment shares the same branding and graphics as Aktuellt. There are no local SVT newscasts on Saturdays.

== Newspapers ==
A lot of newspapers specialize in covering the cities they are based in. Although paper copies of local newspapers are usually sold and circulated exclusively in the local areas they operate (with entities such as libraries or relatives wanting a copy of the paper where a family member is mentioned being mailed copies of the outside of circulation areas), companies may make digital copies of their newspapers available to interested readers directly on their website or through services such as PressReader, often with a paid subscription.

In the United States, although newspapers such as The New York Times and The Washington Post have a 'national' focus on their front pages, they still have dedicated sections for news in the areas they are based in. Weather sections also highlight conditions in the local area and the sports sections feature local teams alongside national sports stories. Their local editions also feature local classified ads.

== Local news in the digital age ==
In the age of digital media, local news readership has started to fall. This can be attributed to the younger generation's disinterest in traditional news sources and the inability of news stations to fully integrate their business models and practices into the age of digital journalism. While national and international news industries began using Twitter as a way to break news and interact with their audiences, local news media have fallen behind, trending towards using Twitter as a secondary source for spreading information rather than a primary tool for audience engagement.

Since Internet sites reach a larger audience, more local news agencies have started their websites to compete in the digital age. Websites are way for local news stations to produce more interactive content which engages the audiences and increases readership.

Aside from the Internet, Twitter specifically has become a great way to engage the younger generation in news, gain more readership, and spread information. National news sources have started using Twitter to quickly notify the public of breaking news and to interact with their readers, but local news has failed to integrate Twitter and other forms of social media into their journalism practices successfully. While local TV news stations have been a bit more effective with using social media, local newspapers have overall fallen behind. By engaging the audience and spreading important information, social media has been considered a solid method for strengthening the core standards of journalism. As a result, social media like Twitter has become a vital tool for news agencies to incorporate into their everyday practices.

As a result of the transition to digital content, local news agencies have had to change their business models. Although they previously gained revenue from subscriptions, more agencies have started making money from online advertising, but this only accounts for a small portion of revenue. This loss in revenue has been linked to a decline in local journalistic integrity because, with less profit, the need to make money through clickbait articles has become a necessity.

=== United States ===
In 2011, the Federal Communications Commission (FCC) issued a report that concluded that growth in the number of media outlets in the United States from satellite radio and television, cable television, and the internet had not offset reductions in local news reporting with public interest, civics, or investigative journalism coverage caused by the decline of newspapers and local news in radio broadcasting. While local television stations were broadcasting a greater total number of news hours and had become some of the largest providers of local news online, most coverage was of crime and courthouses, accidents and disasters, and human interest topics while the depth and quantity of public interest, civics, and investigative journalism coverage declined, and broadcast and internet news media remained heavily reliant on reporting about the latter topics from the declining number of newspapers through fair use exemptions in copyright law. Less than 15% of the news and public affairs programming on commercial news/talk radio was local programming, while the total number of local cable news channels nationally was not growing (and possibly declining in some regions) since most channels were only attempting to break-even rather than be profitable and most cable operators did not invest in local cable news channels and had no plans to do so.

Public-access television (PEG) channels were seeing declining funding and most cable operators did not carry PEG channels. Only 23 states and the District of Columbia had a state public affairs network (SPAN) modeled after C-SPAN that was carried on cable television, and the 2011 FCC report noted that SPANs were not covered under the agency's must-carry rules. A subsequent Pew Research Center study released in 2014 estimated that 54% of statehouse reporters were employed by newspapers, newswires, or college student publications rather than broadcasters, news websites, or other nontraditional media. However, the 2014 Pew study also estimated that 53% of statehouse reporters in the country did not cover the beat full-time for their publications, that 71% of newspapers and 86% of local television stations had no statehouse reporters, and that there was a 35% staff reduction in full-time statehouse reporters from 2003 to 2014 at 220 newspapers surveyed. A subsequent report issued by the Government Accountability Office (GAO) in 2023 found that increases in staffing at digital-native news websites from 2008 to 2020 were not offsetting cuts in newsroom staffing among newspapers (which numbered in the tens of thousands of jobs), while a 2023 Congressional Research Service (CRS) report found that newspapers and television still employed the majority of payrolled newsroom staff in the United States in 2022 while online-only news websites employed less than 10%.

The 2023 GAO and CRS reports noted further that the reduction in subscription and advertising revenue for the newspaper industry from 2000 to 2020 that constituted the overwhelming majority of its inflation-adjusted total revenue was not being offset by digital circulation or online advertising. Also, the 2011 FCC report noted that even though the share of total U.S. advertising spending received by newspapers had been falling since the 1950s, the share received by television and cable did not exceed the share received by newspapers until the 1990s, and that paid circulation by newspapers did not begin to consistently decline until the 1980s. However, despite the shift in advertising revenue to television and cable, the 2011 FCC report noted that local television stations were also seeing declining newsroom staffing alongside newspapers, with some stations outsourcing, reducing, or ending their local news programming and more frequently in smaller media markets. The 2011 FCC report also noted that the agency's must-carry rules did not favor television stations that provided local news programming. The 2023 GAO and CRS reports both noted survey research showing an increasing preference by the American public to receive news through the internet rather than through television, radio, or in print and a declining willingness to pay subscriptions for news, while the 2011 FCC report referenced survey research that found declining news consumption across technological mediums and a preference for entertainment programming on television rather than news.

Additionally, the 2011 FCC report and the 2023 GAO report both noted the unbundling of soft news and hard news content on the internet that formerly provided cross subsidization for newspaper beats, and along with the 2023 CRS report, both noted the unbundling of news content from advertising due to the rise of classified advertising websites and search engine and social media marketing that offer greater targeting than news websites. In light of such changes in consumer preferences and market dynamics, the 2023 GAO report suggested along with the 2011 FCC report that local public interest journalism is at risk of market failure due to having the non-excludable and non-rivalrous features of a public good that generates positive externalities and is vulnerable to free riding. The 2023 GAO report also noted that the FCC has no regulations or guidelines for broadcasters that define what constitutes public interest programming and allows broadcasters wide discretion in determining how to fulfill their public interest obligations under the Communications Act of 1934. Like the Federal Radio Commission under the Radio Act of 1927, the FCC promulgated various public interest programming guidelines and regulations (such as the fairness doctrine) and a process for ascertaining local programming of interest to the communities that the stations were licensed to serve through the 1970s, but these were rescinded or relaxed under FCC Chairs Charles Ferris and Mark Fowler in the 1980s.

In 2021, the FCC's Office of Economics and Analytics released a working paper that found that the market size of Nielsen designated market areas (DMA) as measured by the total number of television households was the key factor that effected the number of commercial television stations with local news operations in the DMA and that increased market size led to diminishing returns. The 38 to 51 largest DMAs, which had at least 615,000 to 800,000 television households and comprised 61% to 69% of U.S. television households in total, could sustain four or more stations while a DMA needed at least 35,000 to 70,000 television households to be able to sustain two stations. However, the working paper also found that in some markets that there was a trade-off between local news programming and the total number of stations due to high fixed costs for production and low marginal costs for distribution, and that despite rising total revenue from 2010 to 2018 due to rising retransmission consent fees, the number of local television stations that originated news fell by 5% while inflation-adjusted advertising revenue fell nationally. In the same year, the Pew Research Center released a survey that found that the percentage of American adults that reported having a cable or satellite television subscription fell from 76% in 2015 to 56% in 2021, while a 2025 Pew survey found that only 36% of American adults reported having a cable or satellite television subscription.

Also, along with the 2023 GAO and CRS reports, a 2022 United States Copyright Office (USCO) report noted that while the news industry and Big Tech companies do not dispute that news aggregators and the web feeds of social media websites drive significant traffic to news sites, the news industry disputes the extent of the traffic and its economic value since aggregators and feeds direct users to articles rather than home pages and because of a substitution effect from aggregators and feeds featuring headlines and portions of article lead paragraphs. The 2023 CRS report noted that the Big Tech companies that receive the majority of online advertising revenue and compete with the news industry for such revenue are also the largest providers of advertising technology to the news industry, and that the Big Tech companies had been alleged to have engaged in anti-competitive conduct in the provision of advertising technology, news aggregators, search engines, social networking services, and app stores. The CRS noted further that almost two-thirds of total U.S. advertising spending by 2020 was online and that more than half of online advertising spending was received by Google and Facebook alone, while inflation-adjusted total U.S. advertising spending fell overall during the preceding two decades.

Ultimately, the 2022 USCO report found that the effectiveness of copyright protections for the news industry were undermined by an inequality of bargaining power between the news industry and the Big Tech companies in concluding that the online advertising revenue dispute between the industries was more of an issue for competition policy rather than copyright law. The 2021 Pew survey also noted that previous industry research released in 2020 found that 55% of American households subscribed to multiple streaming services, while the 2025 Pew survey found that 83% of American adults watched streaming services and that 55% watched streaming services and did not subscribe to cable or satellite television. While streaming television services often include local broadcast television channels, reports issued by the CRS in 2016 and 2020 noted that the FCC had not expanded its definition of multichannel video programming distributors to include online video distributors, and that the regulatory framework for broadcast, cable, and satellite television does not generally apply to streaming television (including must-carry requirements). The 2020 CRS report noted further that vertical integration was a common practice in the streaming television industry, and while subsequent market analysis using the Herfindahl–Hirschman index suggested a trend towards greater competition, the analysis still found market concentration to the degree of oligopoly.

Relatedly, the Pew Research Center issued a report in June 2023 that analyzed the content of 451 podcasts listed on the daily top 200 most popular charts of Apple Podcasts and Spotify from April through September 2022. The report found that only 15% of the podcasts surveyed had a news or current events focus, and that 46% of the news-focused podcasts were affiliated with a traditional news organization. Additionally, 51% of the news-focused podcasts covered sports and topics other than politics and government, and while the episodes of the news-focused podcasts tended to be longer and released more frequently, 78% of the news-focused podcasts followed a commentary, interview, news summary, or recap format rather than an in-depth reporting format. Also, while only 8% of the 451 podcasts surveyed were available exclusively through one site (since 90% were also available through Google Podcasts, 82% through Stitcher, and virtually all of the 51% with a video component through YouTube), only 31% were operated independently while 69% were affiliated with a larger organization, and 47% sought financial support from listeners by paid subscriptions, merchandise sales, or donations with 60% of independently-operated podcasts doing so in comparison to 41% of organization-affiliated podcasts.

=== Influence of Facebook on news stories ===
In 2018, Tech Crunch journalist Josh Constine reported that Facebook "stole the news business" by using its sponsorship of new outlets to make many news publishers its "ghostwriters." Constine further noted that Facebook has been targeting local news sources for many years. In January 2019, Facebook founder Mark Zuckerberg announced that he would spend $300 million investing in local news over three years.

== See also ==
- Broadcast journalism
- Citizen journalism
- Open-source journalism
- Social media

== Works cited ==
- The Information Needs of Communities: The Changing Media Landscape In a Broadband Age (PDF) (Report). Federal Communications Commission. 2011.
- Mitchell, Amy; Jurkowitz, Mark; Enda, Jodi; Matsa, Katerina Eva; Boyles, Jan Lauren (July 10, 2014). America's Shifting Statehouse Press (PDF) (Report). Pew Research Center.
- Cho, Clare Y. (September 25, 2020). Competition Among Video Streaming Services (PDF) (Report). Congressional Research Service.
- Makuch, Kim; Levy, Jonathan (January 15, 2021). Market Size and Local Television News (PDF) (Report). Federal Communications Commission, Office of Economics and Analytics.
- Foglia, Andrew; Weston, Chris; Kern, Melinda; Ringer, Barbara A. (2022). Copyright Protections for Press Publishers (PDF) (Report). United States Copyright Office.
- Evans Jr., Lawrance L. (2023). LOCAL JOURNALISM: Innovative Business Approaches and Targeted Policies May Help Local News Media Adapt to Digital Transformation (PDF) (Report). Government Accountability Office.
- Scherer, Dana A.; Cho, Clare Y. (May 24, 2023). Stop the Presses? Newspapers in the Digital Age (PDF) (Report). Congressional Research Service.
- Stocking, Galen; Matsa, Katerina Eva; Naseer, Sarah; St. Aubin, Christopher; Shearer, Elisa; Jurkowitz, Mark; Ghosh, Shreenita (June 15, 2023). A Profile of the Top-Ranked Podcasts in the U.S. (PDF) (Report). Pew Research Center.

Local community news
