= A Voz da Póvoa =

Local newspaper of Póvoa de Varzim, Portugal

- Type: Weekly local newspaper
- Format: Tabloid
- Owner(s): A Voz da Póvoa - Comunicação Social, S.A.
- Editor: Ferreira de Sousa
- Founded: 1938
- Headquarters: Av. Vasco da Gama Galerias Recife, nº 523, Loja 13; 4490-410 Póvoa de Varzim
- Website: "www.vozdapovoa.com/".

A Voz da Póvoa is one of the three main local newspapers of Póvoa de Varzim, Portugal.

Its current editor-in-chief is Ferreira de Sousa.
