= Free-rider problem =

Market failure benefitting non-paying users

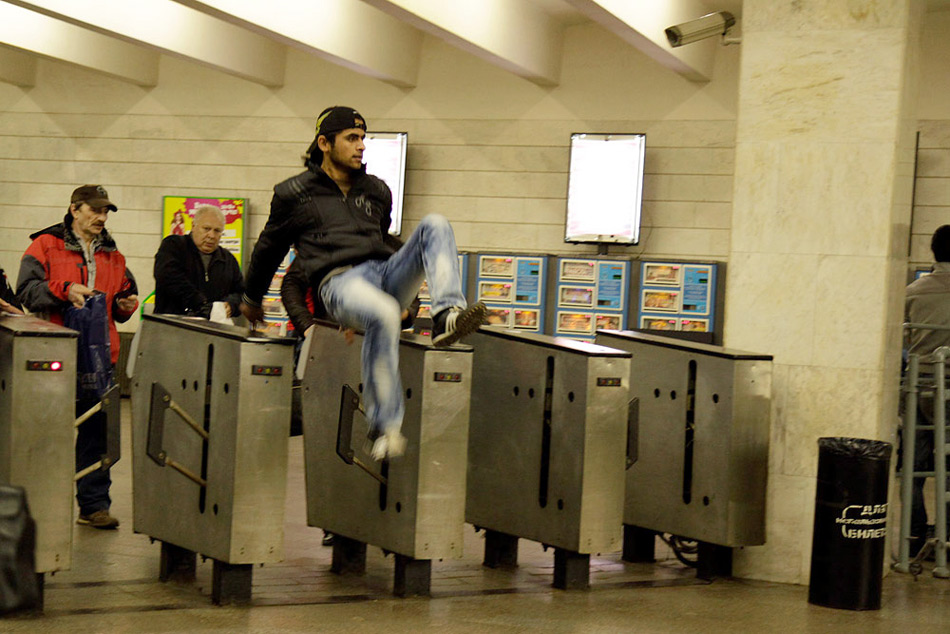
Passengers who circumvent payment turnstiles are "free-riding" on the train.

In economics, the free-rider problem is a type of market failure that occurs when those who benefit from resources, public goods and common pool resources (Note: Examples of such goods are public roads or libraries, or other communal services.) do not pay for them or under-pay. Free riders may overuse common pool resources by not paying for them, neither directly through fees or tolls, nor indirectly through taxes. Consequently, the common pool resource may be under-produced, overused, or degraded. Additionally, despite evidence that people tend to be cooperative by nature (a prosocial behaviour), the presence of free-riders has been shown to cause cooperation to deteriorate, perpetuating the free-rider problem.

In social science, the free-rider problem is the question of how to limit free riding and its negative effects in these situations, such as the free-rider problem of when property rights are not clearly defined and imposed. The free-rider problem is common with public goods which are non-excludable (Note: Non-excludable means that a good cannot be denied to those who do not pay for it.) and non-rivalrous. (Note: Non-rival consumption stipulates that the use of a good or service by one consumer does not reduce its availability for other consumers.) The non-excludability and non-rivalry of public goods results in there being little incentive for consumers to contribute to a collective resource as they enjoy its benefits as per the Tragedy of the commons.

A free rider may enjoy a non-excludable and non-rivalrous good such as a government-provided road system without contributing to paying for it. Another example is if a coastal town builds a lighthouse, ships from many regions and countries will benefit from it, even though they are not contributing to its costs, and are thus "free riding" on the navigation aid. A third example of non-excludable and non-rivalrous consumption would be a crowd watching fireworks. The number of viewers, whether they paid for the entertainment or not, does not diminish the fireworks as a resource. In each of these examples, the cost of excluding non-payers would be prohibitive, while the collective consumption of the resource does not decrease how much is available.

Although the term "free rider" was first used in economic theory of public goods, similar concepts have been applied to other contexts, including collective bargaining, antitrust law, psychology, political science, and vaccines. For example, some individuals in a team or community may reduce their contributions or performance if they believe that one or more other members of the group may free ride.

The economic free-rider problem is equally pertinent within the realm of global politics, often presenting challenges in international cooperation and collective action. In global politics, states are confronted with scenarios where certain actors reap the benefits of collective goods or actions without bearing the costs or contributing to the efforts required to achieve these shared objectives. This phenomenon creates imbalances and hampers cooperative endeavors, particularly in addressing transnational challenges like climate change, global security, or humanitarian crises. For instance, in discussions on climate change mitigation, countries with lesser contributions to greenhouse gas emissions might still benefit from global efforts to reduce emissions, enjoying a stable climate without proportionally shouldering the costs of emission reductions. This creates a disparity between states' contributions and their gains, leading to challenges in negotiating and implementing effective international agreements. The economic free-rider problem's manifestation in global politics underscores the complexities and obstacles encountered in fostering collective action and equitable burden-sharing among nations to address pressing global issues.

== Incentive ==
The application of the prisoner's dilemma, within the context of contributing to a public good, provides a common cause of this problem. Suppose two people were to split a contribution to a public service (such as for a fire station) with society benefiting from their contribution. According to the prisoner's dilemma, certain conclusions can be drawn from the results of this scenario:

- If both parties donate, they both do so out of pocket, and society benefits.
- If one party doesn't pay (in the hopes that someone else will), they become a free-rider, and the other will have to cover the cost.
- If the other party also decides to become a free-rider and not pay either, then society receives no benefit.

This demonstrates that the free-rider problem is generated by individuals' willingness to let others pay when they themselves can receive the benefit at zero cost. This is reinforced by the economic theory of rational choice, which states that people make choices which they infer will provide them with the greatest benefit. Therefore, if a service or resource is offered for free, then a consumer will not pay for it.

== Economic issues ==
Free riding is a problem of economic inefficiency when it leads to the underproduction or overconsumption of a good. For example, when people are asked how much they value a particular public good, with that value measured in terms of how much money they would be willing to pay, their tendency is to under-report their valuations. Goods that are subject to free riding are usually characterized by: the inability to exclude non-payers, its consumption by an individual does not impact the availability for others and that the resource in question must be produced and/or maintained. Indeed, if non-payers can be excluded by some mechanism, the good may be transformed into a club good (e.g. if an overused, congested public road is converted to a toll road, or if a free public museum turns into a private, admission fee-charging museum).

Free riders become a problem when non-excludable goods are also rivalrous. These goods, categorized as common-pool resources, are characterized by overconsumption when common property regimes are not implemented. Not only can consumers of common-property goods benefit without payment, but consumption by one imposes an opportunity cost on others. The theory of 'Tragedy of the commons' highlights this, in which each consumer acts to maximize their own utility and thereby relies on others to cut back their own consumption. This will lead to overconsumption and even possibly exhaustion or destruction of the good. If too many people start to free ride, a system or service will eventually not have enough resources to operate. Free-riding is experienced when the production of goods does not consider the external costs, particularly the use of ecosystem services.

An example of this is global climate change initiatives. As climate change is a global issue and there is no global regime to manage the climate, the benefits of reduced emissions in one country will extend beyond their own countries' borders and impact countries worldwide. However, this has resulted in some countries acting in their own self-interest, limiting their own efforts and free-riding on the work of others. In some countries, citizens and governments do not wish to contribute to the associated effort and costs of mitigation, as they are able to free-ride on the efforts of others. This free rider problem also raises questions in regards to the fairness and ethics of these practices, as countries most likely to suffer the consequences of climate change, are also those who typically emit the least greenhouse gases and have fewer economic resources to contribute to the efforts, such as the small island country of Tuvalu.

Theodore Groves and John Ledyard believe that Pareto-optimal allocation of resources in relation to public goods is not compatible with the fundamental incentives belonging to individuals. Therefore, the free-rider problem, according to most scholars, is expected to be an ongoing public issue. For example, Albert O. Hirschman believed that the free-rider problem is a cyclical one for capitalist economies. Hirschman considers the free-rider problem to be related to the shifting interests of people. When stress levels rise on individuals in the workplace and many fear losing their employment, they devote less of their human capital to the public sphere. When public needs then increase, disenchanted consumers become more interested in collective action projects. This leads individuals to organize themselves in various groups and the results are attempts to solve public problems. In effect this reverses the momentum of free riding. Activities often seen as costs in models focused on self-interest are instead seen as benefits for the individuals who were previously dissatisfied consumers seeking their private interests.

This cycle will reset itself because as individuals' work for public benefit becomes less praiseworthy, supporters' level of commitment to collective action projects will decrease. With the decrease in support, many will return to private interests, which with time resets the cycle. Supporters of Hirschman's model insist that the important factor in motivating people is that they are compelled by a leader's call to altruism. In John F. Kennedy's inaugural address he implored the American people to "ask not what your country can do for you; ask what you can do for your country." Some economists (for example, Milton Friedman) find these calls to altruism to be nonsensical. Scholars like Friedman do not think the free-rider problem is part of an unchangeable virtuous or vicious circle, but instead seek possible solutions or attempts at improvement elsewhere.

== Open communities ==
Open Standards, Open Source and Open Data are now a huge part of our economy, and all share a version of this problem. Propagated by the internet, our digital economy has made it easy to copy and distribute information. Projects from operating systems to content management systems have been developed and maintained by a small group of contributors. Meanwhile a much larger number of individuals, companies, and governments benefit. This happens often without acknowledgement, let alone contributing back to the project. This dynamic has led to sustainability concerns, as core maintainers face burnout and underfunding despite the critical infrastructure role these digital public goods play. Scholars and advocates have highlighted the need for new models—such as public funding, corporate contributions, or support from government institutions.

== Economic and political solutions ==
=== Assurance contracts ===
An assurance contract is a contract in which participants make a binding pledge to contribute to building a public good, contingent on a quorum of a predetermined size being reached, otherwise the good is not provided and any monetary contributions are refunded.

A dominant assurance contract is a variation in which an entrepreneur creates the contract and refunds the initial pledge plus an additional sum of money if the quorum is not reached. The entrepreneur profits by collecting a fee if the quorum is reached and the good is provided. In terms of game theory, this makes pledging to build the public good a dominant strategy: the best move is to abide by the contract regardless of the actions of others.

=== Coasian solution ===
A Coasian solution, named for the economist Ronald Coase, proposes that potential beneficiaries of a public good can negotiate to pool their resources and create it, based on each party's self-interested willingness to pay. His treatise, The Problem of Social Cost (1960), argued that if the transaction costs between potential beneficiaries of a public good are low—that it is easy for potential beneficiaries to find each other and organize pooling their resources based upon the good's value to each of them—that public goods could be produced without government action.

Much later, Coase himself wrote that while what had become known as the Coase Theorem had explored the implications of zero-transaction costs, he had actually intended to use this construct as a stepping stone to understand the real world of positive transaction costs, corporations, legal systems and government actions:

I examined what would happen in a world in which transaction costs were assumed to be zero. My aim in doing so was not to describe what life would be like in such a world but to provide a simple setting in which to develop the analysis and, what was even more important, to make clear the fundamental role which transaction costs do, and should, play in the fashioning of the institutions which make up the economic system.

Coase also wrote:

The world of zero transaction costs has often been described as a Coasian world. Nothing could be further from the truth. It is the world of modern economic theory, one which I was hoping to persuade economists to leave. What I did in "The Problem of Social Cost" was simply to shed light on some of its properties. I argued in such a world the allocation of resources would be independent of the legal position, a result which Stigler dubbed the "Coase theorem".

Thus, while Coase himself appears to have considered the "Coase theorem" and Coasian solutions as simplified constructs to ultimately consider the real 20th-century world of governments, laws, and corporations, these concepts have become attached to a world where transaction costs were much lower and government intervention would unquestionably be less necessary.

==== Fundraising ====
A minor alternative, especially for information goods, is for the producer to refuse to release a good to the public until payment to cover costs is met. For instance, Stephen King authored chapters of a new novel downloadable for free on his website while stating that he would not release subsequent chapters unless a certain amount of money was raised. Sometimes dubbed holding for ransom, this method of public goods production is a modern application of the street performer protocol for public goods production. Unlike assurance contracts, its success relies largely on social norms to ensure (to some extent) that the threshold is reached and partial contributions are not wasted.

One of the purest Coasian solutions today is the new phenomenon of Internet crowdfunding, in which case rules are enforced by computer algorithms and legal contracts, as well as social pressure. For example, on the Kickstarter site, each funder authorizes a credit card purchase to buy a new product or receive other promised benefits, but no money changes hands until the funding goal is met. Because automation and the Internet greatly reduce the transaction costs for pooling resources, project goals of only a few hundred dollars are frequently crowdfunded, far below the costs of soliciting traditional investors.

=== Introducing an exclusion mechanism (club goods) ===
Another solution, which has evolved for information goods, is to introduce exclusion mechanisms which turn public goods into club goods. One well-known example is copyright and patent laws. These laws, which in the 20th century came to be called intellectual property laws, attempt to remove the natural non-excludability by prohibiting reproduction of the good. Although they can address the free rider problem, the downside of these laws is that they imply private monopoly power and thus are not Pareto-optimal.

For example, in the United States, the patent rights given to pharmaceutical companies encourage them to charge high prices (above marginal cost) and to advertise to convince patients to persuade their doctors to prescribe the drugs. Likewise, copyright provides an incentive for publishers to take older works out of print so as not to cannibalize revenue from newer works. An example from the entertainment industry is Walt Disney Studios Home Entertainment's "vault" sales practice, and an example from the technology industry is Microsoft's decision to pull Windows XP from the market in mid-2008 to drive revenue from the widely criticized Windows Vista operating system.

Intellectual property laws also end up encouraging patent and copyright owners to sue even mild imitators in court and to lobby for the extension of the term of the exclusive rights in a form of rent seeking.

These problems with the club-good mechanism arise because the underlying marginal cost of giving the good to more people is low or zero, but because of the limits of price discrimination, those who are unwilling or unable to pay a profit-maximizing price do not gain access to the good. If the costs of the exclusion mechanism are not higher than the gain from the collaboration, club goods can emerge naturally. James M. Buchanan showed in his seminal paper that clubs can be an efficient alternative to government interventions.

On the other hand, the inefficiencies and inequities of club goods exclusions sometimes cause potentially excludable club goods to be treated as public goods, and their production financed by some other mechanism. (Note: Examples of such "natural" club goods include natural monopolies with very high fixed costs, private golf courses, cinemas, cable television and social clubs.) This explains why many such goods, often known as social goods, are often provided or subsidized by governments, co-operatives, or volunteer associations, rather than being left to be supplied by profit-minded entrepreneurs.

Joseph Schumpeter claimed that the "excess profits" (or profits over normal profit) generated by the copyright or patent monopoly will attract competitors that would make technological innovations and thereby end the monopoly. This is a continual process referred to as "Schumpeterian creative destruction", and its applicability to different types of public goods is a source of some controversy. Supporters of the theory point to cases such as that of Microsoft, which has been increasing its prices (or lowering its products' quality), predicting that these practices will make increased market shares for Linux and Apple largely inevitable.

A nation can be considered akin to a club whose members are its citizens. The government would then be the manager of this club. This is further studied in the theory of the state.

=== Non-altruistic social sanctions (common property regimes) ===
Often on the foundation of game theory, experimental literature suggests that free-riding situations can be improved without any state intervention by seeking to measure the effects of various forms of social sanctions. Peer-to-peer punishment, that is, when members sanction other members that do not contribute to the common pool resource by inflicting a cost on "free-riders", is considered sufficient to establish and maintain cooperation.

Social actions come at a cost to the punisher, which discourages individuals from taking action to punish the free-rider. Therefore, punishers often need to be rewarded for following through with their punishment for the resource to be effectively managed. Unlike a prisoner's dilemma where the prisoners are prohibited from communicating and strategizing, people can get together to form "common property regimes" in which the group weighs the costs and benefits of rewarding individuals for sanctioning free riders. So long as the benefits of preserving the resource outweigh the cost of communication and enforcement, members often compensate punishers for sanctioning free riders. While the outcome is not Pareto-optimal, as the group has the additional cost of paying for enforcement, it is often less costly than letting the resource deplete. In the limiting case, where the costs of bargaining and enforcement approach zero, the setup becomes Coasian as the solution approaches the Pareto-optimal solution.

Both punishment and regulation by the state work relatively badly under imperfect information, where people cannot observe the behavior of others. Often common property regimes which members establish through bargaining have more information about the specific common pool resource which they are managing than outsiders. For this reason, and because common property regimes can avoid the principal–agent problem, the specific local knowledge within common property regimes typically enables them to outperform regulations designed by outside technical experts. Nevertheless, the best performance is typically achieved when people in common property regimes consult with governments and technical experts while deciding on the rules and design of their firm, thereby combining local and technical knowledge.

== Altruistic solutions ==
=== Social norms ===
Psychologically, people are only fundamentally considered free-riders by others when they take benefits and withhold contributions. Although free-riders are recognised in all cultures, the degree of tolerance they experience and methods of dealing with them vary due to cultural differences. The impact of social norms on free-riding differs between cultural contexts, which may lead to a variance between results in research on free-riding when applied cross-culturally. However, the impact of social norms on privately- and voluntarily-provided public goods is considered to have some level of effect on free-riding in many contexts. For example, social sanctioning is a norm in and of itself that has a high degree of universality. The goal of much research on the topic of social sanctioning and its effect on free-riding is to explain the altruistic motivation that is observed in various societies.

Free-riding is often thought of only in terms of positive and negative externalities felt by the public. The impact of social norms on actions and motivations related to altruism are often underestimated in economic solutions and the models from which they are derived.

=== Altruistic social sanctions ===
While non-altruistic social sanctions occur when people establish common property regimes, people sometimes punish free-riders even without being rewarded. The exact nature of motivation remains to be explored. Whether costly punishment can explain cooperation is disputed. Recent research finds that costly punishment is less effective in real-world environments.

Other research finds that social sanctions cannot be generalized as strategic in the context of public goods. Preferences between secret sanctions (Note: Untraceable sanctions between players in the game) and standard sanctions (Note: Traceable sanctions, including feedback between players in an otherwise identical environment) on free riders did not vary significantly. Rather, some individuals preferred to sanction others regardless of secrecy. Other research built on the findings of behavioral economics finds that, in a dilemmatic donation game, donors are motivated by the fear of loss. In the game, donors' deposits were only refunded if the donors always punish free-riding and non-commitment among other individuals. Pool-punishment, in which everyone loses their deposit if one donor does not punish the free rider, provided more stable results than punishment without consideration of the consensus of the group. Individual-to-individual peer punishment led to less-consistently-applied social sanctions. Although this research is experimental in nature, it may collectively prove useful when applied in public policy decisions seeking to improve free-rider problems within society.

== See also ==
- Common pool resource
- Economic surplus
- Forced rider
- Leech (computing)
- The Logic of Collective Action
- Moral hazard
- Parasitism (social offense)
- Prisoner's dilemma
- Tragedy of the commons
