= Club good =

Type of economic goods

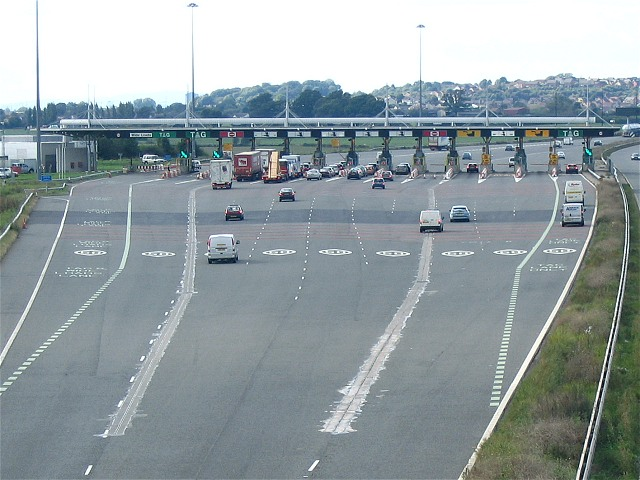
A noncongested toll road is an example of a club good. It is possible to exclude someone from using it by simply denying them access but it is not a rival good since one person's use of the road does not reduce its usefulness to others.

Club goods (also artificially scarce goods, toll goods or quasi-public goods) are a type of good in economics, that are excludable (unlike public goods) but non-rivalrous, at least until reaching a point where congestion occurs. These goods exhibit high excludability, but at the same time low rivalry in consumption. Thus, club goods have essentially zero marginal costs and are often provided by what are known as natural monopolies. Furthermore, club goods have artificial scarcity. Club theory is the area of economics that studies these goods. One of the most famous provisions was published by Buchanan in 1965 "An Economic Theory of Clubs," in which he addresses the question of how the size of the group influences the voluntary provision of a public good and more fundamentally provides a theoretical structure of communal or collective ownership-consumption arrangements.

Club goods are often excluded in order to get people to pay either by nonprofits in order to cover their fixed costs or by for-profit entities to make a profit. For example if you don’t pay for software, you can't download it. If you don’t buy a concert ticket, you can't enter the concert. Although club good marginal cost can be negligible, there will almost always be a deadweight loss from controlling access to it. A cost is imposed on consumers and another cost is borne by providers (from enforcing the mechanisms for exclusion). For toll roads there is the tollbooth installation cost. For software, this deadweight loss arises through the cost of technological measures like encrypting software or digital rights management.

== Definition matrix ==
| | Excludable | Non-excludable |
|---|---|---|
| Rivalrous | Private goods eg. food, clothing, parking spaces | Common-pool resources eg. fish stocks, timber |
| Non-rivalrous | Club goods eg. cinemas, software, private parks | Public goods eg. free-to-air television, air, national defense |

== Where club goods are found ==
Examples of club goods include cinemas, cable television, software as a service, access to copyrighted works, and the services provided by social or religious clubs to their members. The EU is also treated as a club good, since the services it provides can be excluded from non-EU member states, but several services are nonrival in consumption. These include the free movement of goods, services, persons and capital within the Internal Market, and participation in a common currency: for example, adding extra countries to the Schengen Area would not make it more difficult for citizens of current EU members to move between countries.

Public goods with benefits restricted to a specific group may be considered club goods. For example, expenditures that benefit all of the children in a household but not the adults. The existence of club goods for children may offset the effects of sibling competition for private investments in larger families. While a large number of children in a family would usually reduce private investment ratios per child, due to competition for resources, the effects of a larger family on club goods are not as straightforward. As a result of economies of scale, investment ratios in club goods may eventually increase, since the relative price decreases when, in this example, a larger family consumes a club good. They are called child-specific goods and can also be referred to as club goods.

Private club good examples are memberships in gyms, golf clubs, or swimming pools. Both organisations generate additional fees per use. For example, a person may not use a swimming pool very regularly. Therefore, instead of having a private pool, you become member of a club pool. By charging membership fees, every club member pays for the pool, making it a common property resource, but still excludable, since only members are allowed to use it. Hence, the service is excludable, but it is nonetheless nonrival in consumption, at least until a certain level of congestion is reached. The idea is that individual consumption and payment is low, but aggregate consumption enables economies of scale and drives down unit production costs.

== Club theory ==
James M. Buchanan developed club theory (the study of club goods in economics) in his 1965 paper, "An Economic Theory of Clubs". He found that in neo-classical economic theory and theoretical welfare economics is exclusively about private property and all goods and services are privately consumed or utilized. Just over the two decades before his provision in 1965, scholars started to extend the theoretical framework and communal or collective ownership-consumption arrangements were considered as well.

Paul A. Samuelson made an important provision in this regard, making a sharp conceptual distinction between goods that are purely private and goods that are purely public. While it extended the previously existing theoretical framework, Buchanan found that there was still a missing link that would cover the whole spectrum of ownership consumption possibilities. This gap contained goods that were excludable, shared by more people than typically share a private good, but fewer people than typically share a public good. The whole spectrum would cover purely private activities on one side and purely public or collectivized activities on the other side. Therefore, according to Buchanan, a theory of clubs needed to be added to the field.

The goal of his theory was to address the question of determining the "size of the most desirable cost and consumption sharing arrangement".

The model was based on the assumptions that individuals have similar preferences for both private and public goods, the size of the club good and equal sharing of costs. The economic theory of clubs further tries to answer the undersupply equilibrium of a public good provision. Provision of club goods may sometimes pose an alternative to public good provisions by the federal or central government. An issue of club theory is that it may not result in equal and democratic distribution of the good eventually due to its excludability characteristic. James M. Buchanan was primarily interested in voluntary clubs. In these cases club good theory can critically assess how to achieve an optimal number of members of a club as well as the maximum utility for club members.

Examples of private goods that Buchanan offered to illustrate this concept were hair cuts and shoes. Two people can't wear the same exact pair of shoes at the same time, but two or more people can take turns wearing them. As the number of people sharing the same pair of shoes increases, the amount of utility each person derives from the shoes diminishes. For the case of service, like a haircut, the same logic applies. Sharing a haircut means, one-half haircut per month is consumed, or half a physical unit of service. Therefore, the utility for the person deriving from the service declines.

Using the example of a swimming pool facility, James M. Buchanan states that:

As more persons are allowed to share in the enjoyment of the facility, of given size, the benefit evaluation that the individual places on the good will, after some point, decline. There may, of course, be both an increasing and a constant range of the total benefit function, but at some point, congestion will set in, and his evaluation of the good will fall.

But each new member (or co-owner) helps reduce the cost of the club good, so there will be some optimal size of the good that maximizes the benefit for its members.

In the 90s Richard Cornes and Todd Sandler came up with three conditions to determine the optimal club size, which were based at equating costs and benefits at the margin. Firstly, the provision condition which requires determination of the benefits to members from reducing congestion costs and set them in comparison to the cost of capacity. Secondly a utilisation condition, which requires an efficient use of the capacity. Here the user fees equate the members marginal benefit from consumption and the congestion costs the member's participation imposes on others. If the fee is set too low, the club's capacity will be overused, if the fee is too high the capacity will be underutilized. Hence, the club good must be priced in a way that reflects members preferences for crowding.

The third condition is that new members are added to the club, until the marginal benefit from additional membership is equal to the marginal congestion costs.

Because of the three conditions, there is usually a two-part pricing of club goods. One is the fixed up-front membership fees and the other is the per unit charge to achieve an optimal utilisation. In the case of a pure public good, like political lobbying a two-part pricing is not feasible, but a club can provide selective incentives, also called Member-only privileges, like subscribing to the club's magazine or journal. Since clubs compete for members, as long as clubs can be closed freely and members are free to exit, prices for clubs will be in line with costs. The free exit option prevents clubs from charging prices that are too high, but incentivizes free-riding. Members understate their benefits, reduce their effort they supply towards achieving the club's collective goals and take advantage of other club members.

The theory of clubs has been intensively applied to the realm of international alliances. Olson and Zeckhauser (1967) published a cost-sharing analysis of the North Atlantic Treaty Organisation (NATO). In particular they identify the conditions under which it would be in the interest of the club members to increase the size of NATO. According to them every members pay contribution fees, based on their specific marginal values. Therefore, costs shares are computed based on the club's total costs and group size. They point out that the United States is by far the largest contributor to NATO and by that to the collective goal of the institution. The question raised is whether the differences in membership contribution are reasonable given each country's valuation of the provided good by the alliance. Otherwise, the distribution of cost shares is unjust and several member states are free riding.

== See also ==
- Benefit principle
- Collaborative consumption
- Exit (economics)
- Yield management
- Public choice
- Public finance
- Tax choice
- The Logic of Collective Action
- Fair division among groups – a variant of fair division in which the pieces of a resource are given to pre-determined groups and become club goods in these groups.
