= Public good =

Good that is non-excludable and non-rival

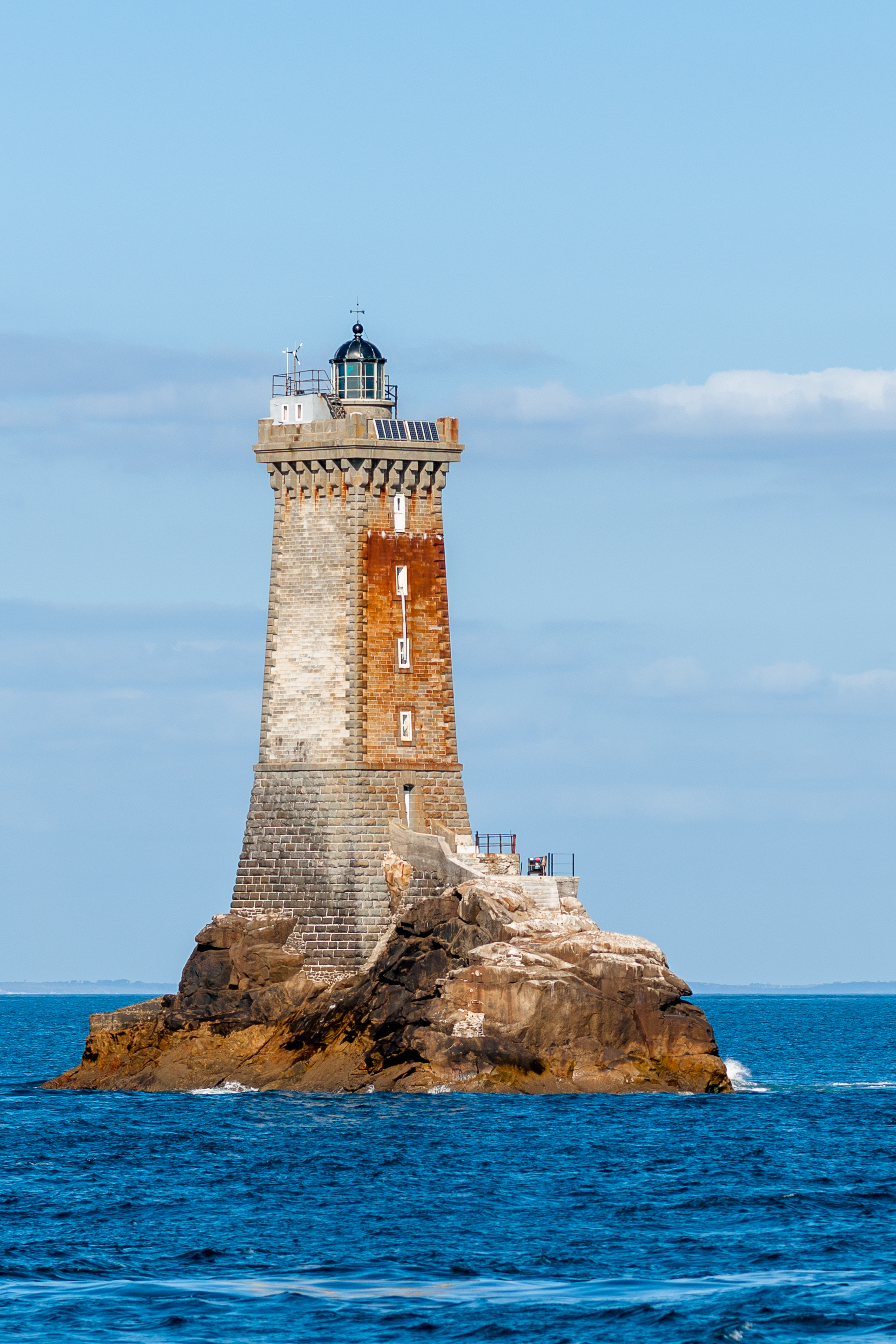
Aids to navigation such as lighthouses are often used as an example of a public good, as they benefit all maritime users, but no one can be excluded from using them.

In economics, a public good (also referred to as a social good or collective good) is a commodity, product or service that is both non-excludable and non-rivalrous and which is typically provided by a government and paid for through taxation. Use by one person neither prevents access by other people, nor does it reduce availability to others, so the good can be used simultaneously by more than one person. This is in contrast to a common good, such as wild fish stocks in the ocean, which is non-excludable but rivalrous to a certain degree. If too many fish were harvested, the stocks would deplete, limiting the access of fish for others. A public good must be valuable to more than one user, otherwise, its simultaneous availability to more than one person would be economically irrelevant.

Capital goods may be used to produce public goods or services that are "...typically provided on a large scale to many consumers." Similarly, using capital goods to produce public goods may result in the creation of new capital goods. In some cases, public goods or services are considered "...insufficiently profitable to be provided by the private sector.... (and), in the absence of government provision, these goods or services would be produced in relatively small quantities or, perhaps, not at all."

Public goods include knowledge, official statistics, national security, common languages, law enforcement, broadcast radio, flood control systems, aids to navigation, and street lighting. Collective goods that are spread all over the face of the Earth may be referred to as global public goods. This includes physical book literature, but also media, pictures and videos. For instance, knowledge can be shared globally. Information about men's, women's and youth health awareness, environmental issues, and maintaining biodiversity is common knowledge that every individual in the society can get without necessarily preventing others access. Also, sharing and interpreting contemporary history with a cultural lexicon (particularly about protected cultural heritage sites and monuments) is another source of knowledge that the people can freely access.

Public goods problems are often closely related to the "free-rider" problem, in which people not paying for the good may continue to access it. Thus, the good may be under-produced, overused or degraded. Public goods may also become subject to restrictions on access and may then be considered to be club goods; exclusion mechanisms include toll roads, congestion pricing, and pay television with an encoded signal that can be decrypted only by paid subscribers.

There is debate in the literature on the definition of public goods, how to measure the significance of public goods problems in an economy, and how to identify remedies.

== Academic literature ==
Paul A. Samuelson is usually credited as the economist who articulated the modern theory of public goods in a mathematical formalism, building on earlier work of Wicksell and Lindahl. In his classic 1954 paper The Pure Theory of Public Expenditure, he defined a public good, or as he called it in the paper a "collective consumption good", as follows:

[goods] which all enjoy in common in the sense that each individual's consumption of such a good leads to no subtractions from any other individual's consumption of that good...

Many mechanisms have been proposed to achieve efficient public goods provision in various settings and under various assumptions.

=== Lindahl tax ===
A Lindahl tax is a type of taxation brought forward by Erik Lindahl, an economist from Sweden, in 1919. His idea was to tax individuals for the provision of a public good according to the marginal benefit they receive. Public goods are costly and eventually someone needs to pay the cost. It is difficult to determine how much each person should pay. So, Lindahl developed a theory of how the expense of public utilities needs to be settled. His argument was that people would pay for the public goods according to the way they benefit from the good. The more a person benefits from these goods, the higher the amount they pay. People are more willing to pay for goods that they value. Taxes are needed to fund public goods and people are willing to bear the burden of taxes. Additionally, the theory dwells on people's willingness to pay for the public good. From the fact that public goods are paid through taxation according to the Lindahl idea, the basic duty of the organization that should provide the people with this services and products is the government.

=== Vickrey–Clarke–Groves mechanism ===
Vickrey–Clarke–Groves mechanisms (VCG) are one of the best-studied procedures for funding public goods. VCG encompasses a wide class of similar mechanisms, but most work focuses on the Clarke Pivot Rule which ensures that all individuals pay into the public good and that the mechanism is individually rational.

The main issue with the VCG mechanism is that it requires a very large amount of information from each user. Participants may not have a detailed sense of their utility function with respect to different funding levels. Compare this with other mechanisms that only require users to provide a single contribution amount. This, among other issues, has prevented the use of VCG mechanisms in practice. However, it is still possible that VCG mechanisms could be adopted among a set of sophisticated actors.

=== Quadratic funding ===
Quadratic funding (QF) is one of the newest innovations in public goods funding mechanisms. The idea of Quadratic voting was turned into a mechanism for public goods funding by Buterin, Hitzig, and Weyl and is now referred to as quadratic funding.

Quadratic funding has a close theoretical link with the VCG mechanism, and like VCG, it requires a subsidy in order to induce incentive compatibility and efficiency. Both mechanisms also fall prone to collusion between players and sybil attacks. However, in contrast to VCG, contributors only have to submit a single contribution – the total contribution to the public good is the sum of the square roots of individual contributions. It can be proved that there is always a deficit that the mechanism designer must pay.

One technique to reduce collusion is to identify groups of contributors that will likely coordinate and lower the subsidy going to their preferred causes.

=== Assurance contracts ===
First proposed by Bagnoli and Lipman, In 1989, assurance contracts have each funder agree to spend a certain amount towards a public good conditional on the total funding being sufficient to produce the good. If not everyone agrees to the terms, then no money is spent on the project. Donors can feel assured that their money will only be spent if there is sufficient support for the public good. Assurance contracts work particularly well with smaller groups of easily identifiable participants, especially when the game can be repeated.

Several crowdfunding platforms such as Kickstarter and IndieGoGo have used assurance contracts to support various projects (though not all of them are public goods). Assurance contracts can be used for non-monetary coordination as well, for example, Free State Project obtained mutual commitments for 20,000 individuals to move to New Hampshire in a bid to influence the politics of the state. Alex Tabarrok proposed a modified mechanism called a dominant assurance contract: a participant who accepts the contract receives a payment if it fails and pays the entrepreneur if it succeeds. For example, in addition to returning their contributions, the mechanism designer might give all contributors an additional $5 if the total donations are not sufficient to support the project. If there is a chance that the contract will fail, a refund bonus incentivizes people to participate in the mechanism, making the all-pay equilibrium more likely. This comes with the drawback that the mechanism designer must pay the participants in some cases (e.g. when the contract fails), which is a common theme.

Zubrickas proposed a simple modification of dominant assurance contracts where people are given a refund bonus proportional to the amount they offered to donate, this incentivizes larger contributions than the fixed refund from Tabarrok's original proposal. There have been many variations on the idea of conditional donations towards a public good. For example, the Conditional Contributions Mechanism allows donors to make variable sized commitments to fund the project conditional on the total amount committed. Similarly, the Binary Conditional Contributions Mechanism allows users to condition their donation on the number of unique funders. Extensions such as the Street Performer Protocol consider time-limited spending commitments.

=== Lotteries ===
Lotteries have historically been used as a means to finance public goods. Morgan initiated the first formal study of lotteries as a public goods funding mechanism. Since then, lotteries have undergone extensive theoretical and experimental research. Combined with their historical success, lotteries are a promising crowdfunding mechanism.

They work by using an external source of funding to provide a lottery prize. Individual "donors" buy lottery tickets for a chance to receive the cash prize, knowing that ticket sales will be spent towards the public good. A winner is selected randomly from one of the tickets and the winner receives the entire lottery prize. All lottery proceeds from ticket sales are spent towards the public good.

Like the other mechanisms, this approach requires subsidies in the form of a lottery prize in order to function. It can be shown that altruistic donors can generate more funding for the good by donating towards the lottery prize rather than buying tickets directly.

Lotteries are approximately efficient public goods funding mechanisms and the level of funding approaches the optimal level as the prize grows. However, in the limit of large populations, contributions from the lottery mechanism converge to that of voluntary contributions and should fall to zero.

=== Role of non-profits ===
Public goods provision is in most cases part of governmental activities. In the introductory section of his book, Public Good Theories of the Nonprofit Sector, Bruce R. Kingma stated that;

In the Weisbrod model nonprofit organizations satisfy a demand for public goods, which is left unfilled by government provision. The government satisfies the demand of the median voters and therefore provides a level of the public good less than some citizens'-with a level of demand greater than the median voter's-desire. This unfilled demand for the public good is satisfied by nonprofit organizations. These nonprofit organizations are financed by the donations of citizens who want to increase the output of the public good.

== Terminology, and types of goods ==
Non-rivalrous: accessible by all while one's usage of the product does not affect the availability for subsequent use.

Non-excludability: that is, it is impossible to exclude any individuals from consuming the good. Paywalls, memberships and gates are common ways to create excludability.

Pure public: when a good exhibits the two traits, non-rivalry and non-excludability, it is referred to as the pure public good. Pure public goods are rare.

Impure public goods: the goods that satisfy the two public good conditions (non-rivalry and non-excludability) only to a certain extent or only some of the time. For instance, some aspects of cybersecurity, such as threat intelligence and vulnerability information sharing, collective response to cyber-attacks, the integrity of elections, and critical infrastructure protection, have the characteristics of impure public goods.

Private good: The opposite of a public good which does not possess these properties. A loaf of bread, for example, is a private good; its owner can exclude others from using it, and once it has been consumed, it cannot be used by others.

Common-pool resource: A good that is rivalrous but non-excludable. Such goods raise similar issues to public goods: the mirror to the public goods problem for this case is the 'tragedy of the commons', where the unfettered access to a good sometimes results in the overconsumption and thus depletion of that resource. For example, it is so difficult to enforce restrictions on deep-sea fishing that the world's fish stocks can be seen as a non-excludable resource, but one which is finite and diminishing.

Club goods: are the goods that are excludable but are non-rivalrous such as private parks.

Mixed good: final goods that are intrinsically private but that are produced by the individual consumer by means of private and public good inputs. The benefits enjoyed from such a good for any one individual may depend on the consumption of others, as in the cases of a crowded road or a congested national park.

=== Definition matrix ===
	Excludable	Non-excludable
Rivalrous	Private goods eg. food, clothing, parking spaces	Common-pool resources eg. fish stocks, timber
Non-rivalrous	Club goods eg. cinemas, software, private parks	Public goods eg. free-to-air television, air, national defense

=== Challenges in identifying public goods ===
The definition of non-excludability states that it is impossible to exclude individuals from consumption. Technology now allows radio or TV broadcasts to be encrypted such that persons without a special decoder are excluded from the broadcast. Many forms of information goods have characteristics of public goods. For example, a poem can be read by many people without reducing the consumption of that good by others; in this sense, it is non-rivalrous. Similarly, the information in most patents can be used by any party without reducing consumption of that good by others. Official statistics provide a clear example of information goods that are public goods, since they are created to be non-excludable. Creative works may be excludable in some circumstances, however: the individual who wrote the poem may decline to share it with others by not publishing it. Copyrights and patents both encourage the creation of such non-rival goods by providing temporary monopolies, or, in the terminology of public goods, providing a legal mechanism to enforce excludability for a limited period of time. For public goods, the "lost revenue" of the producer of the good is not part of the definition: a public good is a good whose consumption does not reduce any other's consumption of that good. Public goods also incorporate private goods, which makes it challenging to define what is private or public. For instance, one may think that the community soccer field is a public good. However, one needs to bring one's own cleats and ball to be able to play. There is also a rental fee that one would have to pay for one to be able to occupy that space. It is a mixed case of public and private good.

Debate has been generated among economists whether such a category of "public goods" exists. Steven Shavell has suggested the following:

when professional economists talk about public goods they do not mean that there are a general category of goods that share the same economic characteristics, manifest the same dysfunctions, and that may thus benefit from pretty similar corrective solutions...there is merely an infinite series of particular problems (some of overproduction, some of underproduction, and so on), each with a particular solution that cannot be deduced from the theory, but that instead would depend on local empirical factors.

There is a common misconception that public goods are goods provided by the public sector. Although it is often the case that government is involved in producing public goods, this is not always true. Public goods may be naturally available, or they may be produced by private individuals, by firms, or by non-state groups, called collective action.

The theoretical concept of public goods does not distinguish geographic region in regards to how a good may be produced or consumed. However, some theorists, such as Inge Kaul, use the term "global public good" for a public good that is non-rivalrous and non-excludable throughout the whole world, as opposed to a public good that exists in just one national area. Knowledge has been argued as an example of a global public good, but also as a commons, the knowledge commons.

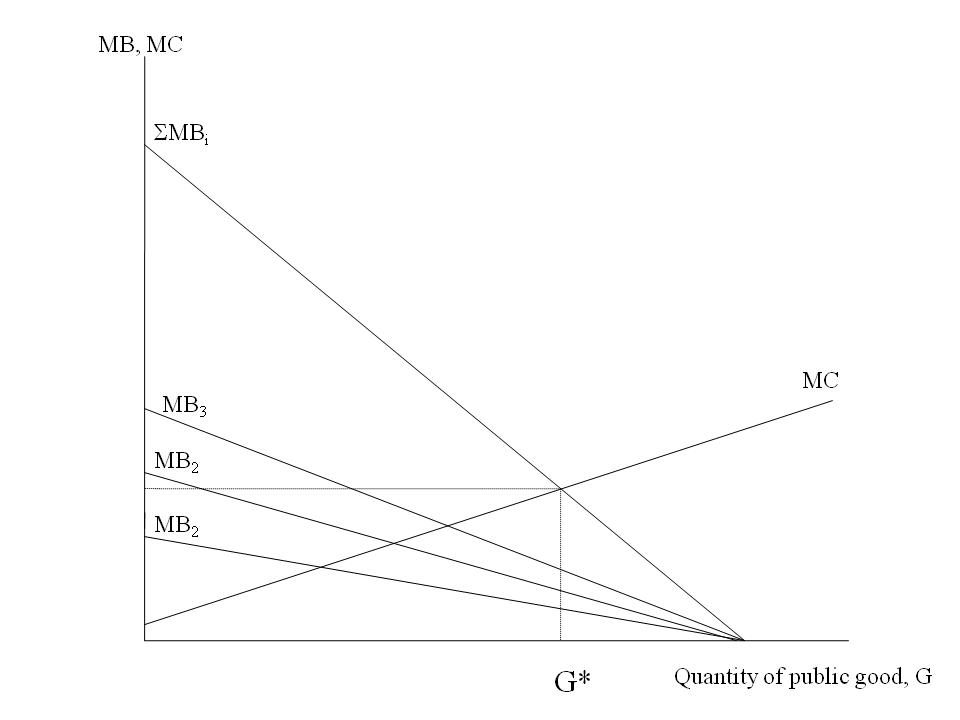
Aggregate demand (ΣMB) is the sum of individual demands (MBi)

Graphically, non-rivalry means that if each of several individuals has a demand curve for a public good, then the individual demand curves are summed vertically to get the aggregate demand curve for the public good. This is in contrast to the procedure for deriving the aggregate demand for a private good, where individual demands are summed horizontally.

Some writers have used the term "public good" to refer only to non-excludable "pure public goods" and refer to excludable public goods as "club goods".

=== Digital public goods ===
Digital public goods include software, data sets, AI models, standards and content that are open source. Use of the term "digital public good" appears as early as April 2017 when Nicholas Gruen wrote Building the Public Goods of the Twenty-First Century, and has gained popularity with the growing recognition of the potential for new technologies to be implemented at scale to effectively serve people. Digital technologies have also been identified by countries, NGOs and private sector entities as a means to achieve the Sustainable Development Goals (SDGs).

A digital public good is defined by the UN Secretary-General's Roadmap for Digital Cooperation, as: "open source software, open data, open AI models, open standards and open content that adhere to privacy and other applicable laws and best practices, do no harm, and help attain the SDGs."

== Examples ==
Yosemite National Park, an example of an environmental good.

=== Common examples ===
- public fireworks
- clean air and other environmental goods
- information goods, such as official statistics
- free and open-source software
- authorship
- public television
- radio
- invention (when there isn't a patent)
- herd immunity
- Wikipedia
- national defense
- fire service
- flood defense
- street lights
- public safety

Further examples of public goods
Class and type of good	Nonexcludable	Nonrival	Common problem
Ozone layer	Yes	No	Overuse
Atmosphere	Yes	No	Overuse
Universal human rights	Partly	Yes	Underuse (repression)
Knowledge	Partly	Yes	Underuse (lack of access)
Internet	Partly	Yes	Underuse (entry barriers)
sunset	yes	yes	none
ADA ramp	yes	yes if usage is low - no if usage is high/congested	under provided (some municipalities or cities will do the bare minimum on standards for ADA ramps. ADA ramps aren't in every sidewalk)
environmental protection	yes	yes	under provided (Some companies will prioritize profits over environmental protection.)

=== Classification challenges ===
- Some goods, like orphan drugs, require special governmental incentives to be produced, but cannot be classified as public goods since they do not fulfill the above requirements (non-excludable and non-rivalrous).
- Law enforcement, streets, libraries, museums, and education are commonly misclassified as public goods, but they are technically classified in economic terms as quasi-public goods because excludability is possible, but they do still fit some of the characteristics of public goods.
- The provision of a lighthouse is a standard example of a public good, since it is difficult to exclude ships from using its services and, since no ship's use of the lighthouse detracts from that of others, lighthouses are non-rival. However, Ronald Coase has argued that since most of the benefit of a lighthouse accrues to ships using particular ports, lighthouse maintenance costs can be profitably bundled in with port fees. This has been sufficient to fund actual lighthouses.(Ronald Coase, The Lighthouse in Economics 1974).
- Technological progress can create new public goods. The simplest examples are street lights, which are relatively recent inventions (by historical standards). One person's enjoyment of them does not detract from other persons' enjoyment, and it would currently be prohibitively expensive to charge individuals separately for the amount of light they presumably use.
- Official statistics are another example. The government's ability to collect, process, and provide high-quality information to guide decision-making at all levels has been strongly advanced by technological progress. On the other hand, a public good's status may change over time. Technological progress can significantly impact the excludability of traditional public goods: encryption allows broadcasters to sell individual access to their programming. The costs for electronic road pricing have fallen dramatically, paving the way for detailed billing based on actual use.

Public goods are not restricted to human beings. It is one aspect of the study of cooperation in biology.

== Free rider problem ==
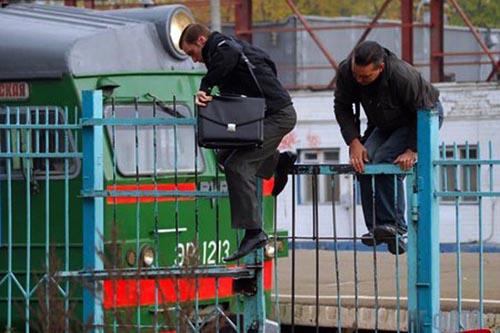
Stowaway passengers who avoid payment turnstiles are "free-riding" on the train.

The free rider problem is a primary issue in collective decision-making. An example is that some firms in a particular industry will choose not to participate in a lobby whose purpose is to affect government policies that could benefit the industry, under the assumption that there are enough participants to result in a favourable outcome without them. The free rider problem is also a form of market failure, in which market-like behavior of individual gain-seeking does not produce economically efficient results. The production of public goods results in positive externalities which are not remunerated. If private organizations do not reap all the benefits of a public good which they have produced, their incentives to produce it voluntarily might be insufficient. Consumers can take advantage of public goods without contributing sufficiently to their creation. This is called the free rider problem, or occasionally, the "easy rider problem". If too many consumers decide to "free-ride", private costs exceed private benefits and the incentive to provide the good or service through the market disappears. The market thus fails to provide a good or service for which there is a need.

The free rider problem depends on a conception of the human being as Homo economicus: purely rational and also purely selfish—extremely individualistic, considering only those benefits and costs that directly affect him or her. Public goods give such a person an incentive to be a free rider.

For example, consider national defence, a standard example of a pure public good. Suppose Homo economicus thinks about exerting some extra effort to defend the nation. The benefits to the individual of this effort would be very low, since the benefits would be distributed among all of the millions of other people in the country. There is also a very high possibility that they could get injured or killed during the course of his or her military service. On the other hand, the free rider knows that they cannot be excluded from the benefits of national defense, regardless of whether they contribute to it. There is also no way that these benefits can be split up and distributed as individual parcels to people. The free rider would not voluntarily exert any extra effort, unless there is some inherent pleasure or material reward for doing so (for example, money paid by the government, as with an all-volunteer army or mercenaries).

The free-riding problem is even more complicated than it was thought to be until recently. Any time non-excludability results in failure to pay the true marginal value (often called the "demand revelation problem"), it will also result in failure to generate proper income levels, since households will not give up valuable leisure if they cannot individually increment a good. This implies that, for public goods without strong special interest support, under-provision is likely since cost–benefit analysis is being conducted at the wrong income levels, and all of the un-generated income would have been spent on the public good, apart from general equilibrium considerations.

In the case of information goods, an inventor of a new product may benefit all of society, but hardly anyone is willing to pay for the invention if they can benefit from it for free. In the case of an information good, however, because of its characteristics of non-excludability and also because of almost zero reproduction costs, commoditization is difficult and not always efficient even from a neoclassical economic point of view.

== Efficient production levels ==
The socially optimal provision of a public good in a society occurs when the sum of the marginal valuations of the public good (taken across all individuals) is equal to the marginal cost of providing that public good. These marginal valuations are, formally, marginal rates of substitution relative to some reference private good, and the marginal cost is a marginal rate of transformation that describes how much of that private good it costs to produce an incremental unit of the public good. This contrasts to the social optimality condition of private goods, which equates each consumer's valuation of the private good to its marginal cost of production.

For an example, consider a community of just two consumers and the government is considering whether or not to build a public park. One person is prepared to pay up to $200 for its use, while the other is willing to pay up to $100. The total value to the two individuals of having the park is $300. If it can be produced for $225, there is a $75 surplus to maintaining the park, since it provides services that the community values at $300 at a cost of only $225.

The classical theory of public goods defines efficiency under idealized conditions of complete information, a situation already acknowledged in Wicksell (1896). Samuelson emphasized that this poses problems for the efficient provision of public goods in practice and the assessment of an efficient Lindahl tax to finance public goods, because individuals have incentives to underreport how much they value public goods. Subsequent work, especially in mechanism design and the theory of public finance developed how valuations and costs could actually be elicited in practical conditions of incomplete information, using devices such as the Vickrey–Clarke–Groves mechanism. Thus, deeper analysis of problems of public goods motivated much work that is at the heart of modern economic theory.

== Local public goods ==
The basic theory of public goods as discussed above begins with situations where the level of a public good (e.g., quality of the air) is equally experienced by everyone. However, in many important situations of interest, the incidence of benefits and costs is not so simple. For example, when people at a workplace keep an office clean or residents monitor a neighborhood for signs of crime, the benefits of that effort accrue to some people (those in their neighborhoods) more than to others. The overlapping structure of these neighborhoods is often modeled as a network. (When neighborhoods are totally separate, i.e., non-overlapping, the standard model is the Tiebout model.)

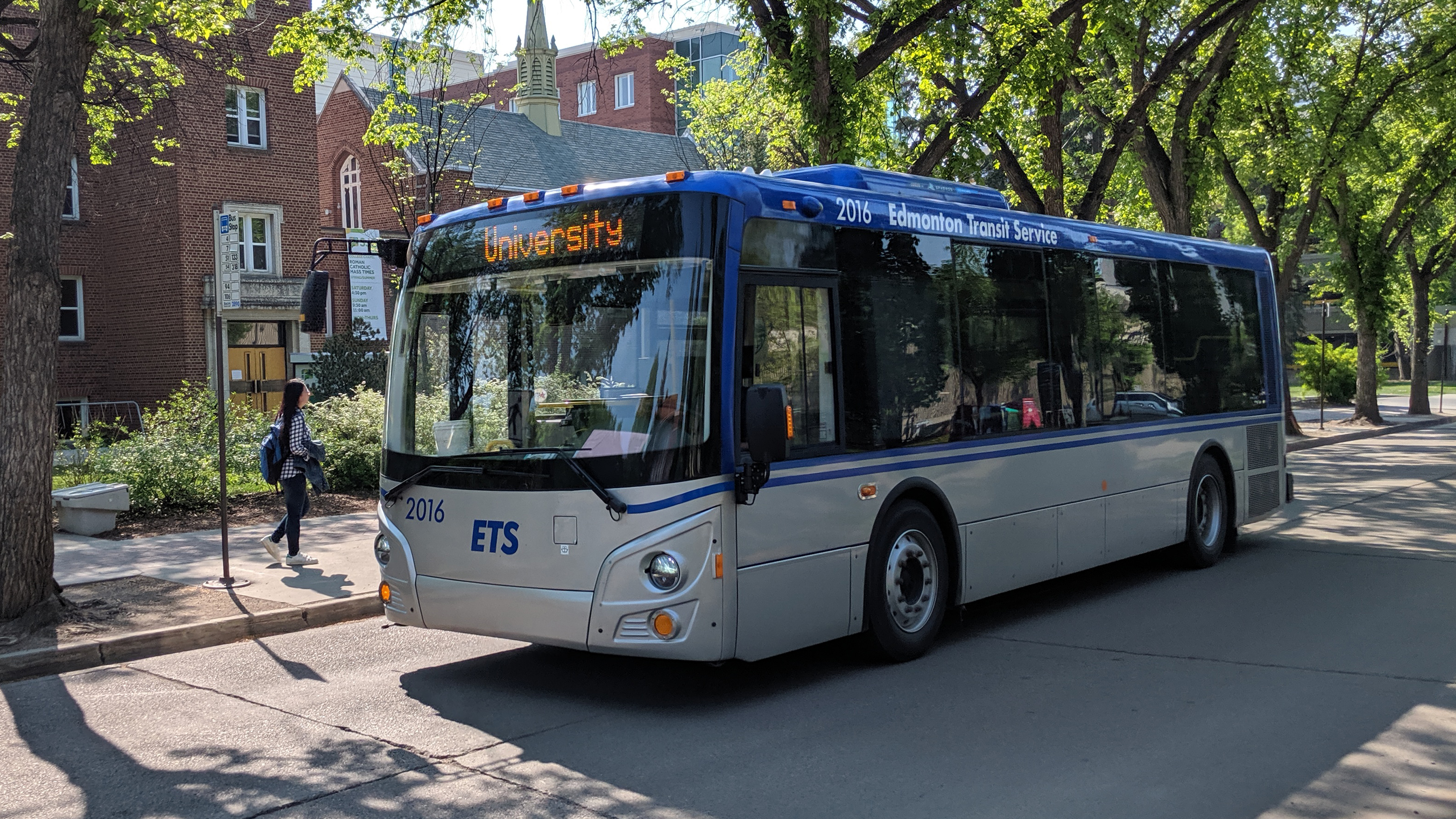
A transit service provides benefits for a wide range of people.

An example of locally public good that could help everyone, even ones not from the neighborhood, is a bus service. If one is a college student who is visiting a friend who goes to school in another city that has bus service, one benefits from this bus service just like everyone that resides in and goes to school in said city. There is also a correlation of benefits and costs that one is now a part of. One is benefiting by not having to walk to one's destination by taking a bus instead. However, others might prefer to walk, so they do not become a part of the problems of automobile-exhaust pollution and congestion.

In 2019, economists developed the theory of local public goods with overlapping neighborhoods, or public goods in networks: both their efficient provision, and how much can be provided voluntarily in a non-cooperative equilibrium. When it comes to socially efficient provision, networks that are more dense or close-knit in terms of how much people can benefit each other have more scope for improving on an inefficient status quo. On the other hand, voluntary provision is typically below the efficient level, and equilibrium outcomes tend to involve strong specialization, with a few individuals contributing heavily and their neighbors free-riding on those contributions.

== Ownership ==
Economic theorists such as Oliver Hart (1995) have emphasized that ownership matters for investment incentives when contracts are incomplete. The incomplete contracting paradigm has been applied to public goods by Besley and Ghatak (2001). They consider the government and a non-governmental organization (NGO) who can both make investments to provide a public good. Besley and Ghatak argue that the party who has a larger valuation of the public good should be the owner, regardless of whether the government or the NGO has a better investment technology. This result contrasts with the case of private goods studied by Hart (1995), where the party with the better investment technology should be the owner. However, it has been shown that the investment technology may matter also in the public-good case when a party is indispensable or when there are bargaining frictions between the government and the NGO. Halonen-Akatwijuka and Pafilis (2020) have demonstrated that Besley and Ghatak's results are not robust when there is a long-term relationship, such that the parties interact repeatedly. Moreover, Schmitz (2021) has shown that when the parties have private information about their valuations of the public good, then the investment technology can be an important determinant of the optimal ownership structure.

== See also ==
- Anti-rival good
- Excludability
- Lindahl tax, a method proposed by Erik Lindahl for financing public goods
- Private-collective model of innovation, which explains the creation of public goods by private investors
- Public bad
- Public trust doctrine
- Public goods game, a standard of experimental economics
- Public works, government-financed constructions
- Privileged group
- Tragedy of the commons
- Tragedy of the anticommons
- Rivalry (economics)
- Quadratic funding, a mechanism to allocate funding for the production of public goods based on democratic principles
