= Excludability =

Degree to which consumption of a good can be restricted

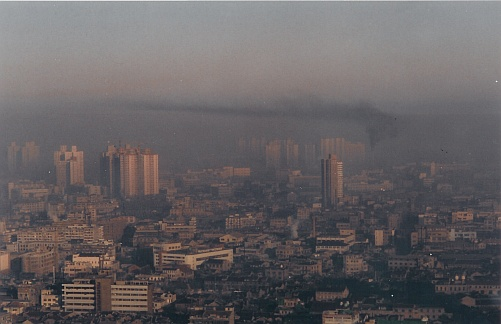
Air, whether it is clean or polluted, cannot exclude anyone from its use, and so it is considered a non-excludable "good". A good can be non-excludable regardless of how desirable it could be to be excluded from consuming it (such as smog or pollution in a city).

In economics, excludability is the degree to which a good, service or resource can be limited to only paying customers, or conversely, the degree to which a supplier, producer or other managing body (e.g. a government) can prevent consumption of a good. In economics, a good, service or resource is broadly assigned two fundamental characteristics; a degree of excludability and a degree of rivalry.

Excludability was originally proposed in 1954 by American economist Paul Samuelson where he formalised the concept now known as public goods, i.e. goods that are both non-rivalrous and non-excludable. Samuelson additionally highlighted the market failure of the free-rider problem that can occur with non-excludable goods. Samuelson's theory of good classification was then further expanded upon by Richard Musgrave in 1959, Garrett Hardin in 1968 who expanded upon another key market inefficiency of non-excludable goods; the tragedy of the commons.

Excludability is not an inherent characteristic of a good. Therefore, excludability was further expanded upon by Elinor Ostrom in 1990 to be a continuous characteristic, as opposed to the discrete characteristic proposed by Samuelson (who presented excludability as either being present or absent). Ostrom's theory proposed that excludability can be placed on a scale that would range from fully excludable (i.e. a good that could theoretically fully exclude non-paying consumers) to fully non-excludable (a good that cannot exclude non-paying customers at all). This scale allows producers and providers more in-depth information that can then be used to generate more efficient price equations (for public goods in particular), that would then maximize benefits and positive externalities for all consumers of the good.

== Examples ==
=== Excludable ===
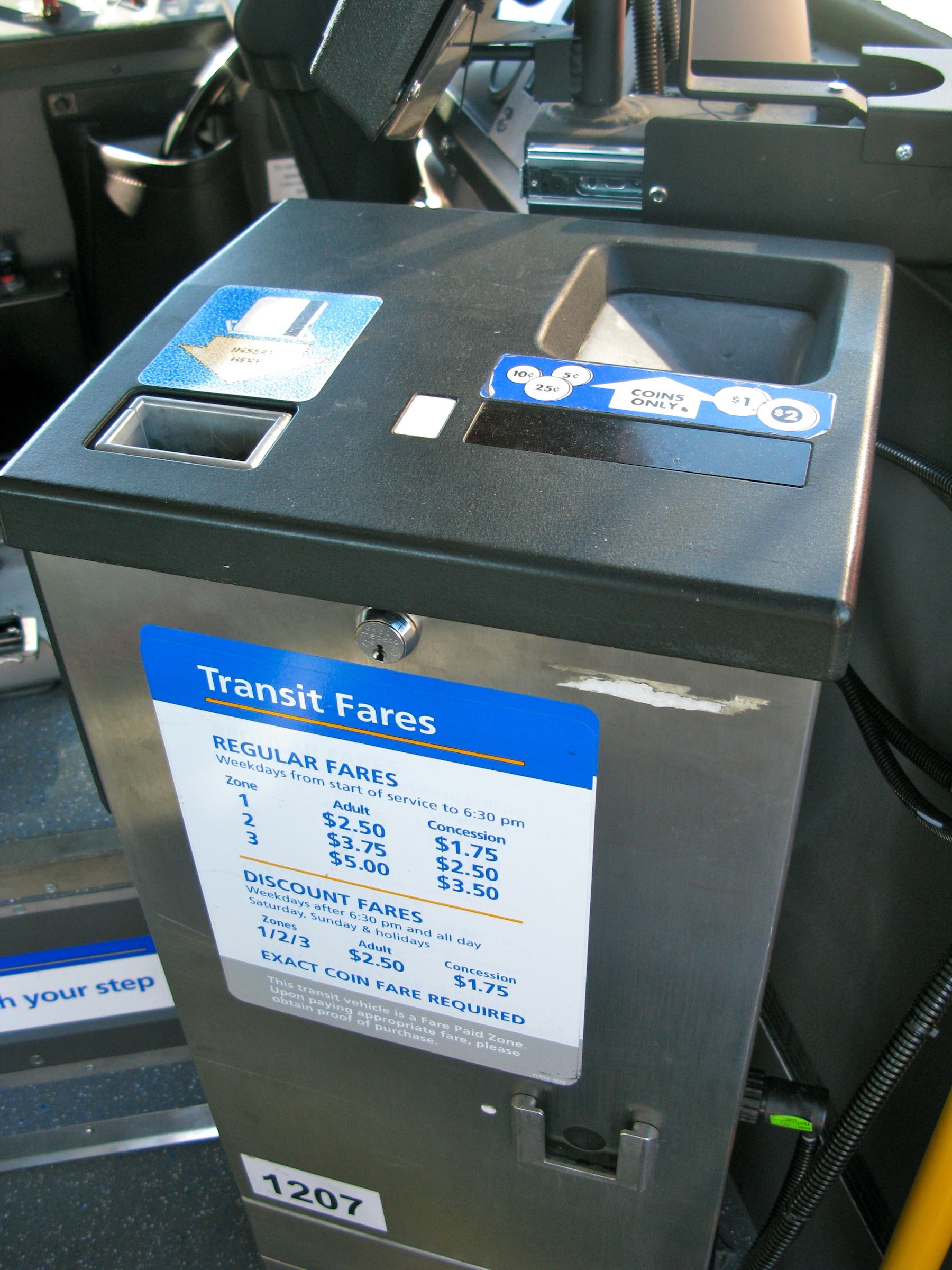
Public transit (bus) farebox, Vancouver

The easiest characteristic of an excludable good is that the producer, supplier or managing body of the good, service or resource have been able to restrict consumption to only paying consumers, and excluded non-paying consumers. If a good has a price attached to it, whether it's a one time payment like in the case of clothing or cars, or an ongoing payment like a subscription fee for a magazine or a per-use fee like in the case of public transport, it can be considered to be excludable to some extent.

A common example is a movie in a cinema. Paying customers are given a ticket that would entitle them to a single showing of the movie, and this is checked and ensured by ushers, security and other employees of the cinema. This means that a viewing of the movie is excludable and non-paying consumers are unable to experience the movie.

=== Semi-excludable ===
Ranging between being fully excludable and non-excludable is a continuous scale of excludability that Ostrom developed. Within this scale are goods that either attempt to be excludable but cannot effectively or efficiently enforce this excludability. One example concerns many forms of information such as music, movies, e-books and computer software. All of these goods have some price or payment involved in their consumption, but are also susceptible to piracy and copyright infringements. This can result in many non-paying consumers being able to experience and benefit from the goods of a single purchase or payment.

=== Non-excludable ===
A good, service or resource that is unable to prevent or exclude non-paying consumers from experiencing or using it can be considered non-excludable. An architecturally pleasing building, such as Tower Bridge, creates an aesthetic non-excludable good, which can be enjoyed by anyone who happens to look at it. It is difficult to prevent people from gaining this benefit. A lighthouse acts as a navigation aid to ships at sea in a manner that is non-excludable since any ship out at sea can benefit from it.

== Implications and inefficiency ==
Public goods will generally be underproduced and undersupplied in the absence of government subsidies, relative to a socially optimal level. This is because potential producers will not be able to realize a profit (since the good can be obtained for free) sufficient to justify the costs of production. In this way, the provision of non-excludable goods typically generates positive externality, as benefits spill over to those who don't pay, which classically leads to market inefficiency. In extreme cases this can result in the good not being produced at all, or it being necessary for the government to organize its production and distribution.

A classic example of the inefficiency caused by non-excludability is the tragedy of the commons (which Hardin, the author, later corrected to the 'tragedy of the unmanaged commons' because it is based on the notion of an entirely rule-less resource) where a shared, non-excludable, resource becomes subject to over-use and over-consumption, which destroys the resource in the process.

== Economic theory ==
Brito and Oakland (1980) study the private, profit-maximizing provision of excludable public goods in a formal economic model. They take into account that the agents have private information about their valuations of the public good. Yet, Brito and Oakland only consider posted-price mechanisms, i.e. there are ad-hoc constraints on the class of contracts. Also taking distribution costs and congestion effects into account, Schmitz (1997) studies a related problem, but he allows for general mechanisms. Moreover, he also characterizes the second-best allocation rule, which is welfare-maximizing under the constraint of nonnegative profits. Using the incomplete contracts theory, Francesconi and Muthoo (2011) explore whether public or private ownership is more desirable when non-contractible investments have to be made in order to provide a (partly) excludable public good.

== See also ==
- Rivalry
- Free rider problem
- Tragedy of the Commons
