= Rivalry (economics) =

Property of economic goods

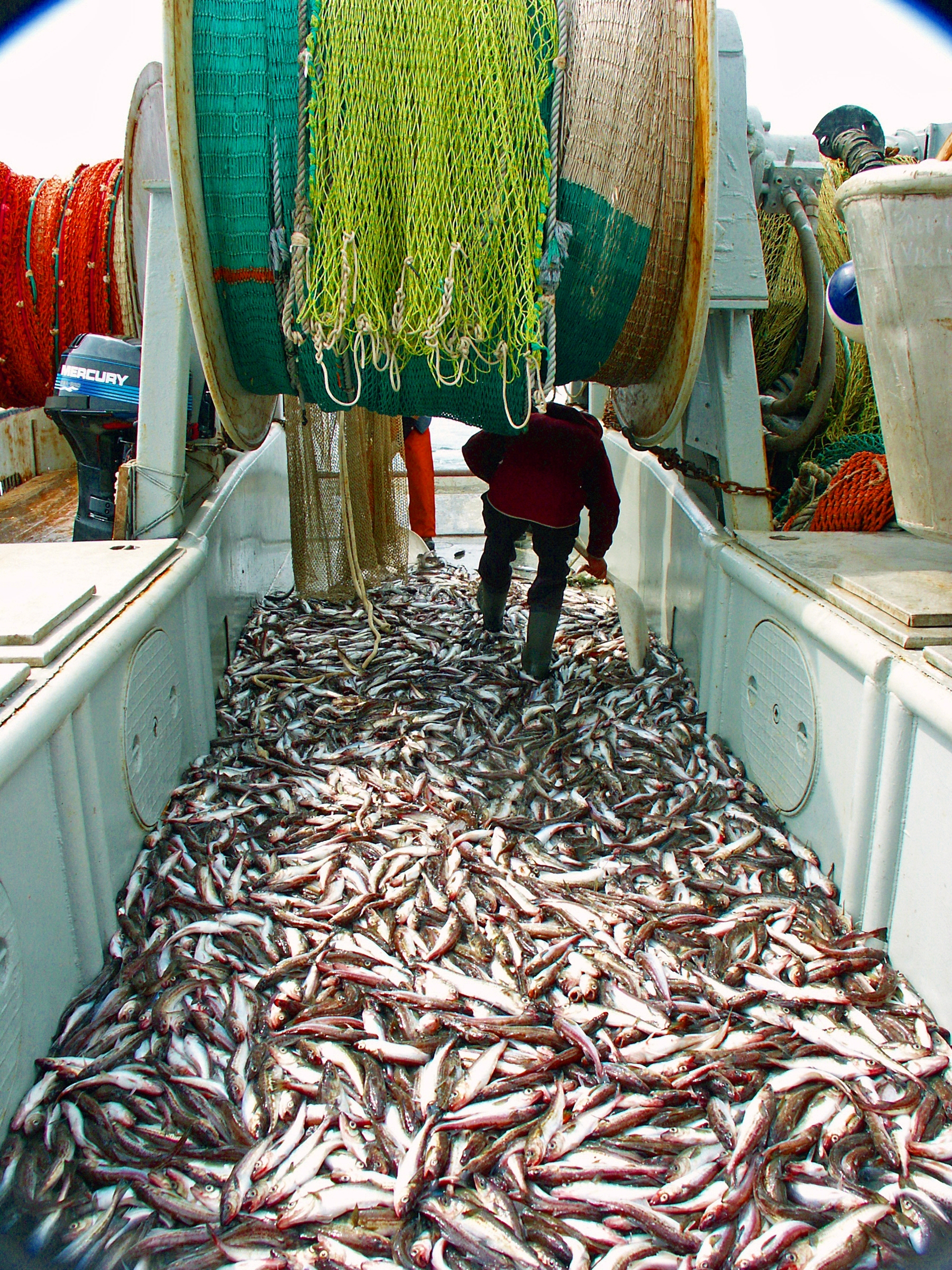
Wild fish stocks are a rivalrous good, as the amount of fish caught by one boat reduces the number of fish available to be caught by others.

In economics, a good is said to be rivalrous or a rival if its consumption by one consumer prevents simultaneous consumption by other consumers, or if consumption by one party reduces the ability of another party to consume it. A good is considered non-rivalrous or non-rival if, for any level of production, the cost of providing it to a marginal (additional) individual is zero. A good is anti-rivalrous and inclusive if each person benefits more when other people consume it.

A good can be placed along a continuum from rivalrous through non-rivalrous to anti-rivalrous. The distinction between rivalrous and non-rivalrous is sometimes referred to as jointness of supply or subtractable or non-subtractable. Economist Paul Samuelson made the distinction between private and public goods in 1954 by introducing the concept of nonrival consumption. Economist Richard Musgrave followed on and added rivalry and excludability as criteria for defining consumption goods in 1959 and 1969.

== Rivalry ==
Most tangible goods, both durable and nondurable, are rival goods. A hammer is a durable rival good. One person's use of the hammer prevents others from using the hammer at the same time. However, some rival goods can still be shared through time; the first user does not generally "use up" the hammer. An apple is a nondurable rival good: once an apple is eaten, it is "used up" and can no longer be eaten by others. Non-tangible goods can also be rivalrous. Examples include the ownership of radio spectra and domain names. In more general terms, almost all private goods are rivalrous.

== Non-rivalry ==
In contrast, non-rival goods may be consumed by one consumer without preventing simultaneous consumption by others. Most examples of non-rival goods are intangible. Broadcast television is an example of a non-rival good; when a consumer turns on a TV set, this does not prevent the TV in another consumer's house from working. The television itself is a rival good, but television broadcasts are non-rival goods. Other examples of non-rival goods include a beautiful scenic view, national defense, clean air, street lights, and public safety. More generally, most intellectual property is non-rival. In fact, certain types of intellectual property become more valuable as more people consume them (anti-rival). For example, the more people use a particular language, the more valuable that language becomes.

Non-rivalry does not imply that the total production costs are low, but that the marginal production costs are zero. In reality, few goods are completely non-rival as rivalry can emerge at certain levels. For instance, use of public roads, the Internet, or police/law courts is non-rival up to a certain capacity, after which congestion means that each additional user decreases speed for others. For that, recent economic theory views rivalry as a continuum, not as a binary category, where many goods are somewhere between the two extremes of completely rival and completely non-rival. A perfectly non-rival good can be consumed simultaneously by an unlimited number of consumers.

== Anti-rivalry ==
Goods are anti-rivalrous and inclusive if the consumer's enjoyment increases with how many others consume the good. The concept was introduced by Steven Weber (2004), saying that when more people use free and open-source software, it becomes easier and more powerful for all users. Lessig noted that any natural language is anti-rivalrous, because its utility increases with how much it is used by others. Cooper noted that efforts to combat climate change are perversely anti-rivalrous—any country acting as a free rider will benefit from the efforts of others to combat this problem, even while not contributing itself.

== See also ==
- Free-rider problem
- Metcalfe's law
- Network effect
- Rent-seeking
