= Alcohol tax =

Excise on alcoholic beverages

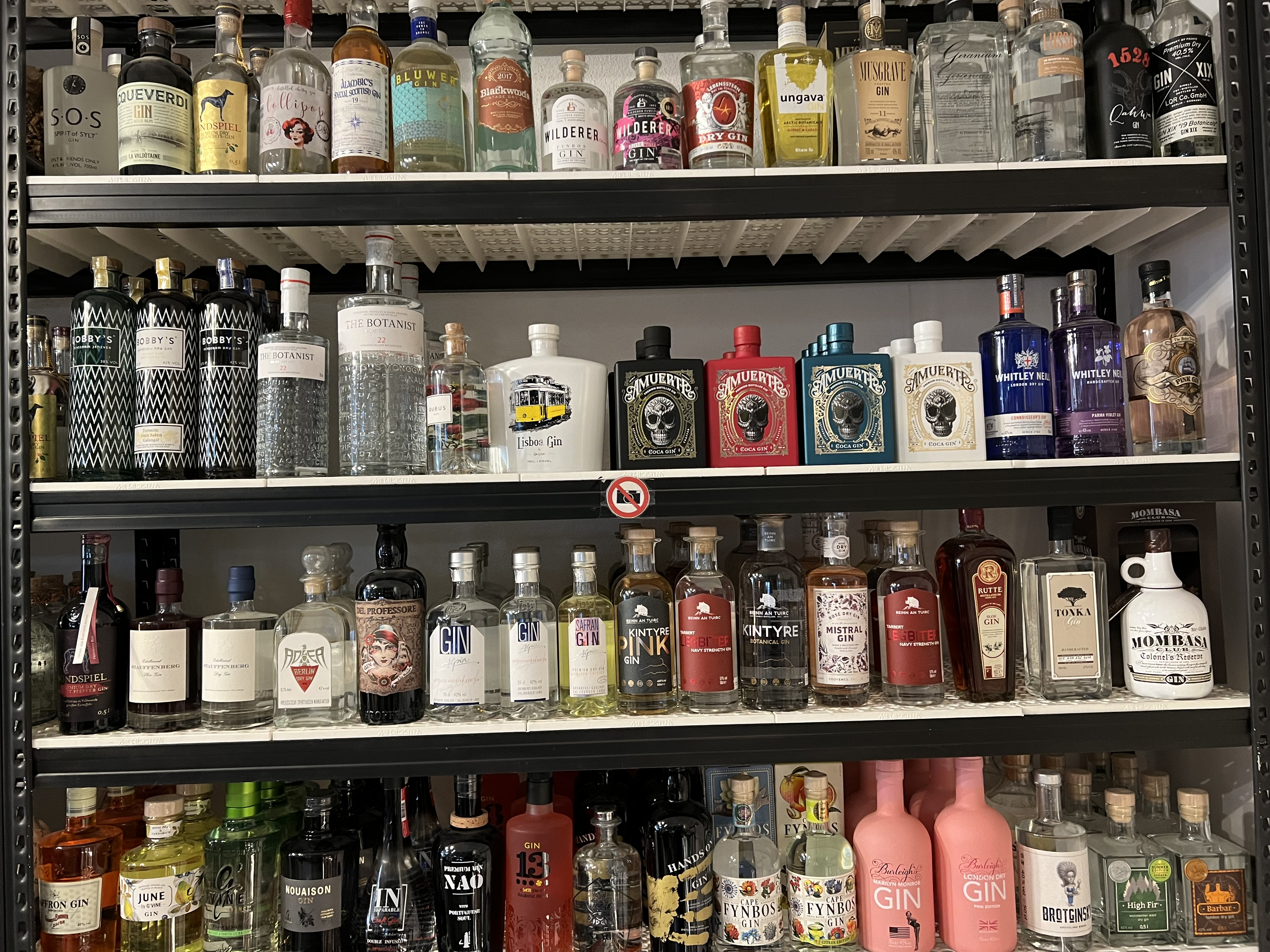
No level of alcohol consumption is safe for health. Worldwide, 2.6 million deaths were caused by alcohol consumption in 2019, from diseases and injuries.

Excise taxes on alcoholic beverages are per unit taxes levied by governments to raise revenue or used as corrective taxes to control health-related externalities associated with consumption of alcohol. Almost all countries tax alcohol. This page addresses the economics and politics of alcohol excise taxation.

== Background ==
Excise taxes are specific taxes applied to production, distribution or sale of a commodity or service, such as alcohol, tobacco, gasoline, sugary drinks, marijuana, plastic bags, indoor tanning, bicycles, firearms, and gambling. Other terms for these taxes are an excise duty, indirect tax, unit tax, user fee, commodity tax, consumption tax, luxury tax, sumptuary tax, and sin tax. Excise taxes may be used to raise revenue or as corrective taxes to address externalities associated with production or consumption. Taxing producers using specific taxes is believed to reduce administrative costs and risks of non-compliance. Excise taxes on alcohol are applied on a per unit basis (ad quantum) on manufacturers and importers, although there may be variation by alcohol content. In contrast, sales taxes and value-added taxes (VAT) are ad valorem taxes that are levied on the price or value of sale. Alcoholic beverages are heavily taxed, with distilled spirits bearing higher taxes followed by wine and then beer.

Governments worldwide have levied excise taxes on alcohol for centuries. In 1572, the County of Holland imposed a tax on beer to fund a war with Spain. England instituted an excise duty on alcohol in 1643 to support its military. Following the Revolutionary War, a tax on distilled spirits in 1791 was the first act of taxation by the newly-formed federal government of the United States. The tax was unpopular on the frontier and led to the Whiskey Rebellion that ended in 1794 when federal forces – led by President George Washington ‒ marched into western Pennsylvania. These duties were instituted by governments to raise needed revenues, which is effective if consumption does not respond very much to tax-induced changes in retail prices. This economic condition is known as a "price inelastic" demand. Evidence on the price elasticity of demand for alcohol beverages is reviewed below. Recent policy proposals for increased excise taxes are largely motivated by a desire to reduce alcohol abuse, including heavy drinking, binge drinking, drunk driving, and other health-related harms from heavy or excessive drinking. Tax revenues may also be ear-marked as user fees for health-related programs. This page reviews evidence for alcohol excises to be effective in reducing heavy drinking, with a focus on conditions in the US and other developed countries. Higher alcohol excise taxes to address externalities are an example of a Pigouvian tax, with early policy proposals along these lines by economists Charles Phelps and Philip Cook.

In 2010, the World Health Organization (WHO) launched its Global Strategy to Reduce the Harmful Use of Alcohol. This program was expanded in 2018 and 2022 to address policy options under the SAFER initiative. Based on considerations of cost-effectiveness, fairness, and feasibility, WHO identified several policy options as "best buys" for reducing alcohol-related harms. The top three options were:

- Taxation: Enacting or increasing excise taxes on alcohol beverages.
- Advertising restrictions: Enacting and enforcing bans or comprehensive restrictions on alcohol advertising, sponsorship, and promotion.
- Availability restrictions: Enacting and enforcing restrictions on physical availability of retailed alcohol.

With regard to taxation and pricing, WHO urged its member governments to influence final prices of alcohol by: (1) establishing a system of taxation applied to alcohol content of beverages with backing by effective enforcement; (2) increasing existing taxes and adjusting regularly for inflation; (3) banning use of price promotions; (4) establishing minimum prices for alcohol and providing price incentives for consumption of non-alcoholic beverages; and (5) reducing or eliminating subsidies to economic operators in the area of alcohol.

Following WHO's policy proposals, there was an expansion of interest in the economics of alcohol taxation and its public health implications. The US Centers for Disease Control and Prevention (CDC) reviewed empirical evidence relating to alcohol prices and alcohol harms and concluded "public health effects are expected to be proportional to the size of the tax increase."

== Regional differences ==
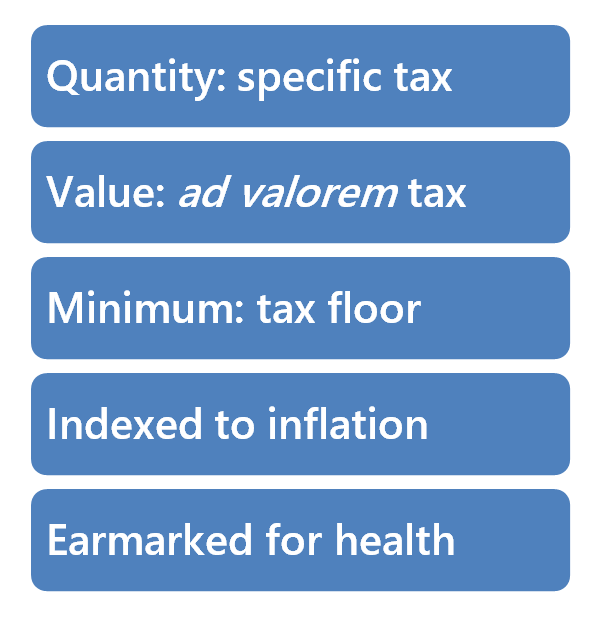
Possible elements of an alcohol tax system include: specific tax, ad valorem tax, tax floor or price floor, indexation to inflation and earmarking for health programmes.

Excise taxes on alcohol are levied on a quantity basis. In the US, federal taxes on beer are currently set at $3.50 per 31-gallon barrel for small producers, $16 for medium-sized producers and all importers, and $18 for larger producers. The tax on table (still) wines with 16% or less alcohol by volume (abv) is $1.07 per gallon. Higher rates apply to fortified and sparkling wines. Distilled spirits are taxed at a rate of $13.50 per proof gallon. A proof gallon in the US is a gallon of alcohol that is 50% abv (100 proof), so a beverage with 40% abv is taxed at a rate of 0.8 or $10.80 per gallon. Federal excise taxes per "standard drink" (0.6 oz. of ethanol) are estimated at: beer, $0.054; wine, $0.042; and spirits, $0.127. Alcohol sales in the US are also subject to taxation at state and local levels. Alcohol sales worldwide are subject to excise and ad valorem taxes. Import duties also apply. Comparison of excise, sales, and total tax rates across countries and beverages requires specification of modal beverage prices.

Several organizations provide data on current levels of alcohol taxation by beverage, country or state including WHO (148 countries) and the Tax Foundation (50 US states and DC). This section provides a summary for fourteen developed countries and the US states for beer and spirits taxes. Comparisons for wine are more complicated as there are a number of countries that do not tax wine or only impose ad valorem taxes. Excise taxes also vary according to beverage abv. Data presented below apply generally to the period 2022 to 2024.

=== By country ===
- Australia – excise taxes on the most sold brand of beer is 17.73% of the retail price. Excise taxes on the most sold brand of distilled spirits is 56.50% of the retail price based on alcohol-specific content. Total tax rate on beer is 26.82%, including VAT/sales taxes and import duties, and 65.59% on spirits. Wine is taxed at a flat rate of 29% of the wholesale price.
- Belgium – excise taxes on beer and spirits are 10.53% and 39.78%, respectively. Total tax rates on beer and spirits are 28.46% and 57.18%, respectively. Excise tax on wine is $7.47 USD per 9L case of still wine. VAT rate is 21%.
- Brazil – excise taxes for the state of Sao Paulo on beer and spirits are 2.28% and 9.16%. Total tax rates on beer and spirits are 29.70% and 32.37%. Brazil has a complex tax structure that applies to production, importation, and final sales of alcohol. Ad valorem taxes on wine are about 40%.
- Canada – excise taxes on beer and spirits are 5.00% and 11.87%. Total tax rates on beer and spirits are 16.50% and 23.38%. Excise tax on wine (> 7% abv) is $4.77 USD per 9L case. VAT rate for wine is 5%. Additional ad valorem taxes are imposed at the provincial level, ranging from 5% to 25% of the purchase price.
- China – excise taxes on beer and spirits are 2.12% and 16.30%. Total tax rates on beer and spirits are 15.26% and 31.14%. For wine, excise tax is 10% and VAT is 17%. China has substantial tariffs on imported wines, with rates on US wine ranging from 29% to 54%.
- Croatia – excise taxes on beer and spirits are 8.93% and 25.30%. Total tax rates on beer and spirits are 28.93% and 45.30%. There is no excise tax on wine. VAT rate is 25%.
- Czechia – excise taxes on beer and spirits are 11.28% and 37.82%. Total tax rates on beer and spirits are 28.63% and 55.17%. There is no excise tax on wine. VAT rate is 21%.
- Germany – excise taxes on beer and spirits are 5.56% and 40.29%. Total tax rates on beer and spirits are 21.52% and 56.25%. There is no excise tax on wine. VAT rate is 19%.
- Greece – excise taxes on beer and spirits are 21.05% and 36.41%. Total tax rates on beer and spirit are 40.40% and 55.77%. There is no excise tax on wine. VAT rate is 24%.
- Japan – excise taxes on beer and spirits are 31.96% and 16.20%. Total tax rates on beer and spirits are 41.05% and 25.29%. Excise tax on wine is $8.19 USD per 9L case. VAT rate is 10%.
- Mexico – excise taxes on beer and spirits are 18.06% and 29.86%. Total tax rates on beer and spirits are 31.85% and 43.66%. Ad valorem tax on wine is 26.5% and total tax is 40-50%.
- Norway – excise taxes on beer and spirits are 40.06% and 68.51%. Total tax rates on beer and spirits are 67.32% and 88.87%. Excise tax on wine is $60.57 USD per 9L case. VAT rate is 20%.
- South Korea – excise taxes on beer and spirits are 15.27% and 43.07%. Total tax rates on beer and spirits are 37.76% and 70.11%. Sales tax on wine is 30% and VAT rate is 10%.
- United Kingdom – excise taxes on beer and spirits are 27.45% and 47.15%. Total tax rates on beer and spirits are 44.12% and 63.82%. Excise tax on wine (> 8.5% abv) is $33.37 USD per 9L case. VAT rate is 20%.

WHO's 2023 report for 148 countries found average excise tax rates for beer and spirits of 17.2% and 26.5%, respectively. Total taxes on beer and spirits were 29.0% and 39.6%. For the sample of fourteen countries, several comparisons are also possible. First, excises on spirits are always higher than beer, with Japan as an exception. Median values for fourteen countries are: beer excise, 13.3%; spirits excise, 37.1%; beer total tax, 29.3%; and spirits total tax, 55.5%. Second, tax rates vary substantially. Range of excises on beer is 2.12% in China to 40.06% in Norway. Range of excises on spirits is 9.16% in Brazil to 68.51% in Norway. Third, total taxes on alcohol are substantial, with most countries having a rate of 25% or more for beer and 50% or more for spirits. Fourth, excises on wine can be substantial as illustrated by Norway and the UK.

In the US, individual states impose excise and sales taxes on alcohol. Figure 1 shows the variation in 2024 for excises on beer among the 50 US states and District of Columbia. Excise rates vary from $0.02 per gallon in Wyoming to $1.29 per gallon in Tennessee, with a median rate of $0.26 per gallon. Taxes are the single most costly ingredient in beer.

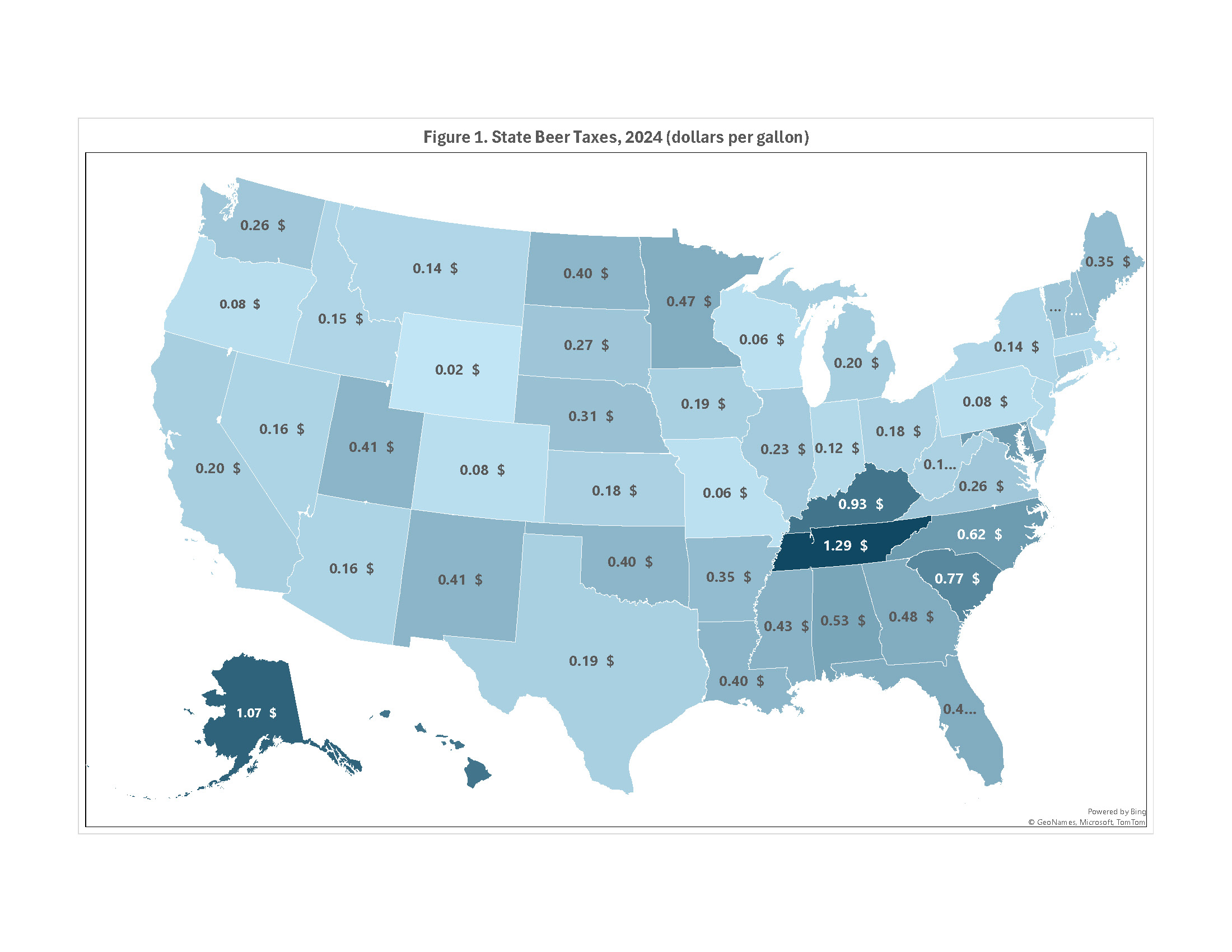
Figure 1

The highest and lowest state excise tax rates by beverage in 2024 are displayed below. Rates vary substantially, suggesting that political factors are at work. Beer taxes are lower in traditional beer producing states of Missouri, Wisconsin, Colorado, and Pennsylvania. Beer taxes are higher in Tennessee and Kentucky, where spirits production is important. Spirits taxes are higher in two states with important wine producers, Oregon and Washington. Wine taxes are also lower in California and New York. Median tax rates for beer, wine and spirits are $0.26, $0.74, and $6.06 per gallon, respectively. These tax rates imply average state excises per proof gallon for beer (5% abv), $2.60; wine (12% abv), $3.08; and spirits (40% abv), $4.85 per gallon.

=== US state rankings ===
- Five states with highest excise taxes per gallon on beer: Tennessee ($1.29); Alaska ($1.07); Kentucky ($0.93); Hawaii ($0.93); and District of Columbia ($0.79).
- Five states with lowest excise taxes per gallon on beer: Wyoming ($0.02); Missouri ($0.06); Wisconsin ($0.06); Colorado ($0.08); and Pennsylvania ($0.08).
- Five states with highest excise taxes per gallon on wine: Alaska ($2.50); Florida ($2.25); Iowa ($1.75); Alabama ($1.70); and New Mexico ($1.70).
- Seven states with lowest excise taxes per gallon on wine: California ($0.20); Texas ($0.20); Wisconsin ($0.25); District of Columbia ($0.30); Kansas ($0.30); Minnesota ($0.30); and New York ($0.30).
- Five states with highest excise taxes per gallon on spirits: Washington ($36.55); Oregon ($22.86); Virginia ($22.06); Alabama ($21.69); and North Carolina ($16.40).
- Five states with lowest excise taxes per gallon on spirits: Missouri ($2.00); Colorado ($2.28); Texas ($2.50); Kansas ($2.50); and Indiana ($2.68).

== Economics ==
In FY2023, US federal revenues from alcohol taxes were $11 billion or 0.25% of total tax revenues. Distilled spirits accounted for 60% followed by beer at 30% and wine at 10% of revenues. An estimate for state governments in 2021 was $8 billion or 0.20% of general revenues. States with the highest share of general revenue from alcohol taxes are Tennessee (0.7%), Alabama (0.6%), and North Carolina (0.6%). In addition, state and local governments collected $12.7 billion from government-owned liquor stores and $0.9 billion in the form of license taxes. Although these are large dollar amounts, alcohol's share of total revenue is small and declining. A common concern is that alcohol taxes have not kept pace with inflation causing a decline in real beverage prices. This is also referred to as increased alcohol "affordability." There also are social costs from excessive use of alcohol that have resulted in political pressures for federal, state, and local tax increases. This section examines economic underpinnings of alcohol excise taxes for revenue and corrective purposes.

An increase in an alcohol tax has several effects. First, the tax is passed-through to retail prices and pass-through rates can be greater or less than 100%. Estimates for pass-through rates are available by beverage for selected countries. Second, the increase in price causes a change in consumer demand for legal products where price elasticities determine reductions in quantity relative to increases in price, with resulting effects on revenues and excess tax burdens. Excess burden is the deadweight loss in consumer surplus over and above increased tax payments that are a transfer to the governmental body. An increase in price will also lead to substitution among brands and beverages due to cross elasticity of demand effects. If long-run demands are more elastic, ear-marking of taxes can lead to revenue shortfalls. Third, the price increase is expected to affect consumer behaviors so that adverse effects of alcohol consumption are altered or reduced. The nature and extent of reduction is an evidence issue, which is examined here for heavy drinking prevalence, binge drinking, and liver cirrhosis mortality. Cost-effectiveness studies reverse the analysis by first calculating a social cost estimate for alcohol consumption and then determining how a given tax increase might reduce these costs. Components of cost estimates are an important issue as public health analyses combine external costs of alcohol abuse and private productivity (internal) costs of alcohol use. Private costs are measured by the value of lost wages. Fourth, alcohol taxes raise several political issues, including tax regressivity, tax neutrality, and unintended consequences.

=== Pass-through to retail prices ===
Excise taxation is expected to have some impact on retail prices of alcohol beverages. A standard exercise in economics is to analyze "who actually pays the tax." Is it consumers, producers, or both? Tax incidence analysis is the study of how a tax burden is shared between consumers and producers, regardless of statutory legal obligations to collect the tax. In simple terms, this is an issue of whether an excise tax is fully passed-through to final consumers or not. Pass-through rates of less than 100% imply that some portion of a tax is shifted forward to consumers and the remaining portion is shifted backwards to producers. Tax pass-throughs to retail prices depend on the elasticity of demand relative to the elasticity of supply. In competitive markets, increases in retail prices will be greater (smaller) as elasticity of demand decreases (increases) and elasticity of supply increases (decreases). These same principles apply in the long-run, except the expectation for many industries is that long-run supply is perfectly elastic (constant cost industry), and an excise tax will be fully shifted to retail prices. The pass-through rate in this case is 1.0 or 100%.

Some empirical studies report a pass-through of more than 100%. There are several reasons why this might occur. First, there are menu costs of price changes that lead to sticky prices, so producers and retailers recognize that less frequent price changes might be optimal over the longer-run. Second, the market might be non-competitive and rival producers strategize on pass-throughs, which depend generally on complex features of demand functions. Third, price structures across brands and beverages are complex reflecting substitution possibilities, and some products may have pass-throughs of less than unity while others more than unity. In addition to direct effects on price, a tax based on alcohol content can result in producer substitution toward non-taxed features (Barzel effect) while a simple unit tax on gallonage can result in consumer substitution toward higher quality, higher-priced brands and beverages (Alchian-Allen effect). Other substitutions, such as trading-down to lower-priced brands and beverages, is an important detail for revenue collections and corrective policies. Cross-border purchases and counterfeit or unrecorded alcohol purchases also are important as unintended consequences.

A systematic review of 30 studies of alcohol excise pass-through rates for a variety of countries found evidence that beer taxes are over-shifted, and wine and spirits taxes are fully-shifted. Applying more advanced meta-analysis methods lead to a conclusion that there was full-shifting for all beverages. In general, taxes are passed through quickly within a few months of an increase, but border effects with low-tax jurisdictions are important. One UK study demonstrated undershifting for cheaper brands while six other studies found no supporting evidence for this result. Overall, these results indicate that alcohol excise taxes in most instances are fully-shifted to beverage prices and consumers.

=== Elasticity of demand ===
Empirical (econometric) studies of alcohol demand have been conducted by economists since the 1950s for the US and other countries, especially English-speaking countries. A general finding is that demand for alcohol beverages is price inelastic, meaning a 10% increase in own-price will result in a less than 10% decrease in consumption. Branded products and narrower beverage categories have higher elasticities, reflecting available substitutes. Cross-price elasticities and income elasticities are positive, meaning alcohol beverages are substitutes and consumption rises along with real incomes. Another common finding is that the price elasticity of demand for total alcohol is about -0.50, implying a general 10% price increase will reduce overall alcohol consumption by 5%. Evidence indicates that beer has the least elastic demand, followed by wine, and then spirits. A number of issues must be considered in any empirical study such as data sample, econometric methods, data outliers, and sensitivity analysis of important results. Sensitivity analysis can lead to numerous primary estimates that are not statistically independent. In some studies, tax rates are used as proxies for beverage prices.

Results of past studies can be summarized using a narrative review or quantitative meta-analysis. In a properly conducted meta-analysis, similar primary results are summarized using weighted means based on precision weights (inverse variances) applied to point estimates. Controls should also be included for non-independent estimates and publication bias. Publication bias is the general problem that primary investigators select results according to statistical significance (data dredging or positive-results bias) or journal editors and reviewers select articles for publication according to strongly-held beliefs about expected outcomes (confirmation bias or file drawer problem). In the first case, meta-analysis estimates should be corrected for publication bias. The second case is managed generally by a thorough literature search for both published and unpublished results.

Four meta-analyses have been conducted by economists. Despite differences in methods and samples, there is general agreement among these surveys. The range of average demand elasticities for beer is about -0.35 to -0.37; wine, -0.57 to -0.70; spirits, -0.52 to -0.66; and total alcohol, -0.50 to -0.58. A separate study of 153 countries by Clements et al. (2020) reported a higher beer elasticity for richer countries, but their results might reflect a grouping that includes countries with different beverage preferences (beer intensive vs. wine or spirits intensive). Beer price elasticities in their study are less elastic at lower incomes and higher prices.

Overall, the demand for alcohol beverages is price inelastic, which implies that excise taxes on alcohol are effective to generate tax revenues. Beer is the least elastic and beer is the preferred beverage by binge drinkers and heavy drinkers, accounting for a sizable percentage of all alcohol consumed. There also can be substitution among beverages, with most studies finding that each beverage is a positive substitute for others. An increase in taxes on wine will induce a shift in legal consumption toward beer or spirits as relative prices change. An accounting of the change in consumption of wine alone might miss some of the shift toward other alcohol beverages.

=== Effects on heavy drinking ===
A substantial literature exists in public health and economics on statistical effects of alcohol prices (or taxes) on drinking behaviors and a variety of alcohol-related harms. This section provides a brief review for selected harms: heavy drinking, binge drinking, and liver cirrhosis mortality. In many cases, only a small number of empirical studies exist for a given harm or group of harms. Although quantitative summaries of empirical estimates are sometimes reported, these tend to use small samples, combine estimates from diverse studies, and ignore statistical significance. A qualitative or narrative summary provides structured results without claims of quantitative precision. An alternative empirical method is to examine drinking outcomes on a before-after basis ‒ a natural experiment ‒ based on a given change in alcohol policy. Numerous studies along these lines have been conducted, especially for alcohol policy changes in Scandinavia. A summary is presented for empirical studies that examine alcohol-related harms on a before-after basis following important policy changes.

Two systematic surveys provide broad-based analysis of economic and public health studies of prices and excessive drinking by adults and youth. First, 19 primary studies of alcohol prices and heavy drinking by adults were examined and only two studies showed that adults drinkers were significantly and negatively responsive to changes in alcohol prices or taxes. Second, nine primary studies were examined for alcohol prices and liver cirrhosis mortality, with only two reporting significant results. Third, 56 primary studies were examined for alcohol prices and binge drinking ‒ only 3 of 18 studies of youth reported a significant negative effect of prices on measures of binge drinking; only 8 of 19 studies of young adults reported significant results for one or more genders; and only 5 of 19 studies of adults reported significant results for one or more genders. Fourth, a review of eleven primary studies of binge drinking using natural experiments and field methods found only three that reported significant results. At best, these two surveys found mixed results, raising important issues of effectiveness of alcohol tax increases for heavy drinking and binge drinking among youth, young adults, and adult populations.

The price elasticity for heavy-drinking adults approaches zero in many past empirical studies by economists. In a key study of heavy drinking, Ayyagari et al. (2013) examined two groups of US drinkers: the first group is completely unresponsive to price, drinks more heavily on average, and is more likely to binge drink; and the second groups is highly responsive to price but drinks lightly or moderately. The authors conclude that drinker heterogeneity is crucial to economic welfare analysis since higher taxes will fall on both groups and could fail to reduce alcohol-related externalities. Results in Kenkel (1996) suggest that better health information is an effective policy to reduce health costs of heavy drinking. He finds the least-informed drinkers had a perfectly inelastic demand for alcohol, but better-informed heavy drinkers had demands that were more elastic than moderate drinkers. Further, Dee (1999) argues that many binge drinking studies lack a credible identification strategy. After controlling for state-level "drinking sentiment," he reports insignificant results for beer taxes and binge drinking by youth and adults.

Lastly, an alternative approach to empirical research is to use evidence from natural experiments. For example, in 2008, taxes on alcopops in Australia were increased by 70%. In the same year, Finland increased taxes on spirits by 15% and beer and wine by 10%. Before-after studies examine the impact of policy changes on drinking behaviors and alcohol-related harms, such as drink-driving, violent crime, and liver cirrhosis. Particular attention has been paid to the Nordic countries due to changes in alcohol policies following tax harmonization in the European Union in 2003-2004. A survey by Nelson and McNall (2016) summarizes the substantial literature that uses natural experiments, including 45 primary studies covering nine countries (Australia, Denmark, Finland, Hong Kong, Iceland, Russia, Sweden, Switzerland, United States). A variety of alcohol-related harms were examined, with a general conclusion that natural experiments in alcohol policy have selective effects on various harms and subpopulations. This conclusion is reinforced in a second review by Nelson and McNall (2017) of additional results from 29 primary studies covering five countries (Denmark, Finland, Hong Kong, Sweden, Switzerland). Only 4 of 18 studies reported positive effects of reduced alcohol prices on binge drinking for all age groups; only 4 of 18 studies reported positive results for prices and alcohol consumption by youth and young adults; and the policy changes examined had little effect on heavy drinking by adults.

Alcohol tax interventions have selective, rather than broad impacts on populations, drinking patterns, and alcohol-related harms. Studies of economic costs and benefits of increased alcohol taxes fail to properly account for these differences as well as the economic costs imposed on responsible drinkers.

== Political aspects ==
Political factors are expected to impact the magnitude and structure of alcohol excise taxes as revenue devices or as corrective user fees. The study of political aspects of economic policies, including taxation, is labeled Public Choice Economics. This section provides a review of contributions of public choice economists to on-going debate on alcohol taxation.

A central tenet of public choice is that politicians and bureaucrats are self-interested and operate to help ensure their electability or budget size and authority. For example, repeal of Prohibition in 1933 allowed a cash-strapped US government to legalize and tax alcohol sales. A second tenet is that regulations and government programs create or cater to interest groups. One interest group is direct beneficiaries of regulation and a second is an industry group that might try to benefit at the expense of another industry member. Competition for political favors among various interest groups is labeled by economists as rent-seeking behavior, which imposes real costs on society. A tax increase that is focused on wine will likely benefit brewers and distillers at the expense of vintners. The increase will also find moral and other support from direct beneficiaries and bureaucrats, which is known as a Bootleggers and Baptists coalition. It also helps enactment and enforcement of regulations if rewards to beneficiaries are concentrated on a per capita basis, and costs to others are wide-spread and dispersed. Large stakes in a policy issue create incentives to lobby or otherwise support a regulation. These political forces are frequently at work in discussion and debate over alcohol as selective excise taxation is largely a distributive issue. Holcombe (1997: 82) observes that "taxes are created through the political process [and] special interests supply the driving force behind them."

An example of politics at work is the recent history of US federal taxation of alcohol. In 1990, faced with a rising budget deficit, Congress justified significantly higher alcohol taxes on grounds that "increasing the alcoholic beverage excise taxes could help to place some of the [social] costs of alcohol consumption on alcohol users and could reduce alcohol consumption among teenagers." The brunt of the tax increase, however, fell on wine as excises rose six-fold from $0.17 per gallon of still wine to $1.07 per gallon. In 2017, Congress reversed course and passed the Craft Beverage Modernization Act. This Act lowered alcohol taxes on selected beverages and created tiered tax categories for smaller and medium-sized domestic producers. For craft brewers under 60,000 barrels per year, the tax rate was reduced from $7.00 per barrel to $3.50 per barrel. For wine, the abv for still wine was increased from 14% to 16% and various tax breaks were granted to smaller wineries. Tax rates for larger producers were mostly unchanged from 1990, although they benefit from lower rates on initial production runs. Ultimately, what matters for consumer choice is relative prices of various products. Making tax structures more complex as Congress choose to do in 2017 will open-up possibilities for unintended substitution, which might defeat one or more tax objectives and thereby set the stage for another round of tax policy negotiations.

Public choice economists have focused on several other issues surrounding enactment and enforcement of alcohol excise taxes. First, excise taxes do not rate high on traditional economic criteria for tax equity ("fairness"). One reason may be that some heavy drinkers – such as the young, less educated, and the poor – do not vote with a high frequency. Alcohol taxes tend to be regressive and discriminatory, which violates two basic equity principles. Vertical equity is the principle that tax liabilities should rise with ability to pay. A specific tax is progressive if higher income households pay a greater share of their income in taxes than do lower income households. Horizontal equity is the neutrality principle that tax liabilities should be equal for individuals with equal ability to pay. Because tax rates differ by beverage and alcohol content, progressiveness and neutrality do not exist. Overall, excises in the US are regressive taxes, although the alcohol tax component is less certain due to unequal tax rates, substitution, and lifetime effects. Early studies found complex patterns across income groups as drinking propensity increases with income and there is trading-up among beverages. A study by Conlon et al. (2021) examines alcohol consumption and income using US data for 2018. Their findings indicate a lower-income group that drinks heavily (10 standard drinks per week) and a heavy-drinking high-income group (11 drinks per week). Together these two groups account for about 12% of the population, suggesting that alcohol excise taxes impose a heavier burden on low-income and middle-income groups who drink less frequently or less heavily. The authors also note that purchases of sin goods ‒ alcohol, tobacco, and soft drinks ‒ are concentrated with 10% of households paying 80% of sin taxes.

Second, alcohol excises do not rate high on a tax efficiency scale. As taxes are levied on a per unit or volumetric basis, non-taxable product attributes can be affected such as age of a brand of Scotch or its packaging. These changes are endogenous and inefficient. Taxes also fall on both harmful and responsible drinkers. Corrective excise tax proposals create a dilemma. Taxing inelastic demands ‒ such as beer drinkers ‒ raises revenue but does not do very much to reduce consumption or alcohol harms. Taxing elastic demands will reduce consumption and possibly harms but does not raise needed revenues. The efficiency loss – excess burden of taxation – will be greater for individuals with elastic demands, who may well be responsible drinkers. Hines (2007: 64) states the dilemma as follows: "the government is unable to distinguish taxes on a customer's first drink of alcohol, which has no external costs, from taxes on the seventh drink just prior to driving a car . . . corrective policy entails a compromise between correcting externalities and distorting ordinary consumer decisions." This distortion or efficiency loss is ignored in cost-benefit calculations and cost-effectiveness analyses (as an externality imposed on moderate drinkers). Studies conducted by WHO and CDC do not include dead-weight losses imposed on responsible drinkers. Not surprisingly, these losses are widely dispersed among drinking populations.

Third, alcohol excise taxes are often advocated as user fees and tax revenues may be ear-marked for public programs addressing harms from alcohol or other health concerns. However, as tax revenues are fungible there is nothing in place to ensure that individual benefits are commensurate with costs, which violates the benefit principle of taxation. Taxing the young and poor may result in a wealth transfer to better-off populations.

Except for occasional mention of tax regressivity, these economic principles have seen little discussion in the public health community. Typically, cost calculations for alcohol abuse include private productivity losses that account for 40-50% of all costs. Private losses are not properly a part of cost-effectiveness calculations at least as seen by most economists. Social cost estimates are also uncertain and frequently based on limited evidence. From a public choice perspective, more precisely targeted regulatory policies are available such as increased penalties for drunk driving or underage drinking. A final consideration is side-effects of taxes or what is also known as unintended consequences. A short list includes: (1) substitution behaviors by consumers such as switching to cheaper products or home-produced alcohol; (2) substitution behaviors by producers such as altering product formulations to reduce or avoid taxes; (3) tax evasion in the form of cross-border shopping and unrecorded production of "bootleg" alcohol; and (4) effects on industry market structure as a consequence of differential taxes imposed on different-sized producers and beverages.

== See also ==
- Alcohol law
  - Alcohol law in the United States
  - Alcohol monopoly
  - Alcoholic beverage control state
- Economic rent
- Effect of taxes and subsidies on price
- Excess burden of taxation
- Excise tax in the United States
- Government failure
- Law of demand
- Market failure
- Regulatory economics
- Tax
- Tax policy
- Tobacco taxation
- Three-tier system (alcohol distribution)
- Theories of taxation
