= Lindahl equilibrium =

A Lindahl equilibrium (LEQ) is a solution concept for allocating a fixed budget across several divisible public goods. It describes how efficiency and fairness can be sustained in an economy with public goods, using personalized prices; the payments induced by these prices are known as Lindahl taxes.

== Importance ==
LEQ yields an allocation that satisfies the complementary conditions of efficiency and fairness:

- LEQ satisfies the Samuelson condition, which implies that it is Pareto efficient. This is so despite the good in question being a public one. It thus demonstrates how efficiency can be reached in an economy with public goods by the use of personalized prices. The personalized prices equate the individual valuation for a public good to the cost of the public good.
- LEQ always lies in the (weak) core of the allocation problem, which can be viewed as a criterion of fairness.

== History ==
Erik Lindahl proposed the underlying scheme in 1919: each household is charged a personal price for the public good, equal to its own marginal valuation, so that all households voluntarily agree on the quantity to be provided. Paul Samuelson later gave the modern formal treatment of public goods and derived the efficiency condition that bears his name, which any Lindahl equilibrium satisfies. Leif Johansen then gave the complete interpretation of the concept of "Lindahl equilibrium", which assumes that household consumption decisions are based on the share of the cost they must provide for the supply of the particular public good.

Lindahl and Samuelson defined the LEQ in a general economy, in which there are both public and private goods. Fain, Goel and Munagala present a specialized definition, for the case in which there are only public goods. They also initiated the study of computing a LEQ.

== Definition ==
The definitions below follow and.

- There are n agents. Each agent has a personal budget B_{i}_{.} The total budget is the sum of all personal budgets: B = B_{1} + ... + B_{n}. In some applications, the input is the total budget B, and it is assumed that each agent controls an equal share of the budget, so B_{i} = B/n.
- There are k types of divisible public goods. The goal is to decide on an allocation x of the budget, such that x_{1}+...+x_{k} = B.
- Each agent i has a utility function U_{i} over possible allocations of the budget.

An allocation x is a Lindahl equilibrium if there exist personal price-vectors p_{1},...,p_{n} such that the following two conditions hold:

1. For every agent i, the allocation x is affordable: $\mathbf{p_i}\cdot \mathbf{x} \leq B_i$. Moreover, x maximizes the utility U_{i}(x) among all affordable allocations, that is, x is the best bundle that agent i could buy with his share of the budget and his personal prices. In other words: if each agent chooses the best public bundle he can afford given his personal prices, then all agents unanimously choose the same public bundle (assuming all agents break ties in the same way).
2. The allocation x maximizes the profit, defined as $\left(\sum_{i=1}^n \mathbf{p_i}\cdot \mathbf{x}\right) - |\mathbf{x}|_1$. Intuitively, it is assumed that some producer can produce public goods in cost 1, and he sells them to the public; his profit is the total amount of money he gains from selling the goods in the given prices, minus the total cost of production. An equivalent condition is that, for each public good j, $\sum_{i=1}^n p_{i,j} \leq 1$, with equality if $x_j>0$.

=== Characterization without price vectors ===
A Lindahl equilibrium allocation in a market of public goods has a characterization without the price-vectors. Specifically, when all agents have an equal share of the budget (B_{i} = B/n), an allocation x is a LEQ if and only if, for every good j, $\sum_{i=1}^n \frac{\frac{\partial}{\partial x_j} U_i(\mathbf{x})} {\sum_m x_m {\frac{\partial}{\partial x_m} U_i(\mathbf{x})}} \leq \frac{n}{B}$, where the inequality becomes an equality when $x_j>0$.

== Relation to the Lindahl tax ==
The personalized price-vector p_{i} in the definition of LEQ can be interpreted as the Lindahl tax rates on agent i. The payment p_{i}·x that agent i makes at the equilibrium allocation is the Lindahl tax that agent i actually pays.

Lindahl taxation for public goods is an equilibrium for two reasons. First, individuals are willing to pay the respective taxes for the quantity of public goods provided. Second, the cost of the public good is covered by the aggregate taxes. Therefore, the Lindahl pricing centers around the benefit principle, in which individuals are taxed based on their valuation of the benefit received from the good. LEQ also provides the efficient level of public goods, as the social marginal benefit is equivalent to the social marginal cost.

== Relation to other equilibrium concepts ==
LEQ is, in a sense, dual to the notion of competitive equilibrium in a market of private goods (Fisher market):

- In a Fisher market equilibrium, there is a single price-vector for all agents, but each agent has a different bundle;
- In a LEQ, there is a personal price-vector for each agent, but all agents have the same bundle.

One way to formalize the relation between these two concepts is to split each public good into n distinct personalized commodities, one for each agent, who is then the only buyer of "their" copy. In the resulting artificial economy, the personalized prices are ordinary prices, and a Lindahl equilibrium is literally a competitive equilibrium; this device is what allows existence and welfare theorems for private-goods economies to be transferred to public goods.

Garg, Goel and Plaut show that a public decision-making problem can be transformed into an equivalent Fisher market by expanding each issue into one good per pair of disagreeing agents, and that the prices of that private-goods market induce an equilibrium of the public problem which maximizes Nash welfare (like the LEQ).

LEQ is also closely related to solution concepts in cooperative game theory. Foley proved that every Lindahl allocation belongs to the core of the public-goods economy, but the converse fails: Muench gave an example of an economy whose core contains allocations that are not Lindahl allocations, so the core–equilibrium equivalence familiar from replicated private-goods economies does not carry over to public goods.

Several other equilibrium concepts weaken the linearity of Lindahl prices while keeping the cost-sharing logic:

- In Kaneko's ratio equilibrium each agent is assigned a constant ratio of the total cost of the public good rather than a personal price per unit, and the equilibria of the associated voting game coincide with its core.
- Mas-Colell and Silvestre's cost share equilibrium replaces the personal price by a personal cost-share function, which makes the concept applicable when production of the public good exhibits increasing returns; for an economy with a single public good it coincides with Kaneko's ratio equilibrium, and by reinterpreting the commodity space it also covers economies with only private goods or with externalities.

== Existence ==
Foley proved that, if the utility functions have continuous derivatives, are strictly increasing, and are strictly concave, then a LEQ exists in the general case of mixed public and private goods, and moreover, it lies in the fractional core. However, his proof is existential and does not provide an efficient algorithm.

Roberts established existence for a general class of economies with public goods, and analysed the properties of the resulting Lindahl solution. A survey by Milleron collects the early existence, efficiency and core results and situates them within general equilibrium theory.

Existence arguments of this kind rely on convexity of preferences and of the production technology; Mas-Colell and Silvestre's cost share equilibria were introduced in part to obtain an equilibrium notion even with increasing returns in the production of the public good.

== Strategic aspects ==
The mechanism that, given agents' utilities, computes the LEQ, is not strategyproof, even in the setting with only public goods. This is a special case of the free-rider problem: an agent who understates their marginal benefit lowers their own tax while barely reducing the quantity provided.

Because of this, the literature turned from truthful reporting to implementation: rather than asking agents for their valuations, one designs a game whose equilibrium outcomes are Lindahl allocations. Hurwicz constructed outcome functions whose Nash equilibrium points yield exactly the Lindahl allocations in economies with public goods, and the Walrasian allocations in the private-goods case. Walker gave a considerably simpler scheme in which each agent announces a single number; its equilibria are Pareto optimal and are in fact LEQ, no agent is worse off than at their initial holding, and equilibria are guaranteed to exist in classical public-goods economies.

== Computation ==
Fain, Goel and Munagala present an algorithm for computing the LEQ using convex programming, in the special case in which agents have scalar-separable non-satiating utilities. Particularly:

- If the agents' utilities are homogeneous of degree 1 and concave, the Lindahl equilibrium allocation can be computed by maximizing the Nash welfare $\sum_{i=1}^n \log U_i(\mathbf{x})$. Moreover, the gradient of this objective function can be computed using quadratic voting.
- For more general non-satiating utility functions, the Lindahl equilibrium can be computed by maximizing a potential function, that can be seen as a regularized version of the Nash welfare.

Kroer and Peters present an algorithm for computing the LEQ when agents have separable linear utility functions over the public goods. They study two settings:

- Uncapped setting - any public good can enjoy an unbounded amount of funding. In that case, LEQ is equivalent to the Nash welfare rule (maximizing the product of utilities), and can be computed by a variant of Proportional response dynamics. They show that this dynamic is equivalent to mirror descent on a new formulation of the program; this provides a direct proof for convergence of this dynamics.
- Capped setting - any public good has a maximum amount beyond which it cannot use any more funds (such a constraint is common in combinatorial participatory budgeting). They prove that their new convex program works in this setting too, and yields LEQ.

Related computational work studies the same market logic in models of collective decision-making. Conitzer, Freeman and Shah introduced the fair public decision making model, in which a decision must be taken on several issues at once and a single decision can benefit many agents, and showed that the maximum Nash welfare solution satisfies or approximates several relaxations of proportionality in that setting. Garg, Goel and Plaut show that a single common price per issue can lead to arbitrarily bad market equilibria, which motivates personalized (Lindahl-style) pricing, and give the reduction to Fisher markets described above.

== Discrete Lindahl equilibrium ==
Peters, Pierczyński, Shah and Skowron present an adaptation of the concept of Lindahl equilibrium to a market with indivisible public goods. In this setting, a Lindahl equilibrium may be not Pareto-efficient.

- Example: there are three goods (a, b1, b2) and two voters, where Alice values a, b1 at 1 and b2 at 0, and George values a, b2 at 1 and b1 at 0. The budget of each agent is 3, and the cost of each good is 2. Producing only {a} is a Lindahl equilibrium, with prices for Alice: 2-0.009, 2-0.006, 0.001 and prices for George: 2-0.009, 0.001, 2-0.006. This is because (1) it maximizes the profit: the producer would not gain from producing b1 or b2; (2) it maximizes the agents' utilities: no agent can afford another desirable good. But {a} is not efficient, since it is dominated by {a,b1,b2}.

If the definition is strengthened to require that the total payment for each public good exactly equals its cost, then the stronger Lindahl equilibrium notion is equivalent to a concept they call strict stable priceability. A stable-priceable committee does not always exist, but extensive simulation experiments show that an "almost" stable-priceable committee almost always exists. It is possible to check in polynomial time whether a given committee is stable-priceable.
