= Lindahl tax =

Economic concept proposed by Erik Lindahl

A Lindahl tax is a form of taxation conceived by Erik Lindahl in which individuals pay for public goods according to their marginal benefits. In other words, they pay according to the amount of satisfaction or utility they derive from the consumption of an additional unit of the public good. Lindahl taxation is designed to maximize efficiency for each individual and provide the optimal level of a public good.

Lindahl taxes can be seen as an individual's share of the collective tax burden of an economy. The optimal level of a public good is that quantity at which the willingness to pay for one more unit of the good, taken in totality for all the individuals is equal to the marginal cost of supplying that good. Lindahl tax is the optimal quantity times the willingness to pay for one more unit of that good at this quantity.

== History ==
The idea of using aggregate marginal utility in the analysis of public finance was not new in Europe. Knut Wicksell was one of the most prominent economists who studied this concept, eventually arguing that no individual should be forced to pay for any activity that does not give them utility. Erik Lindahl was deeply influenced by Wicksell, who was his professor and mentor, and proposed a method for financing public goods in order to show that consensus politics is possible. As people are different in nature, their preferences are different, and consensus requires each individual to pay a somewhat different tax for every service, or good that he consumes. If each person's tax price is set equal to the marginal benefits received at the ideal service level, each person is made better off by provision of the public good and may accordingly agree to have that service level provided.

== Lindahl model ==
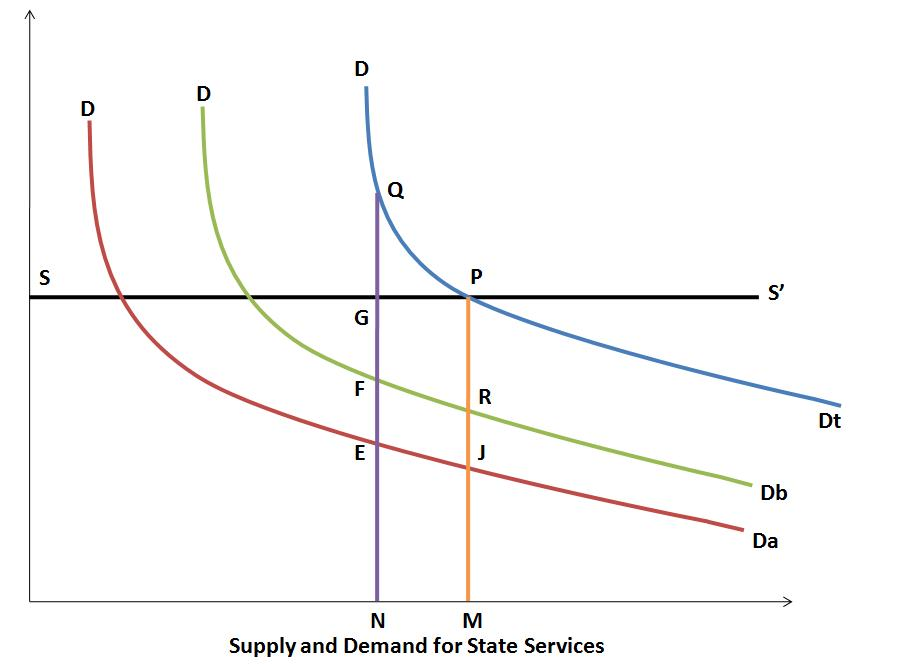
Lindahl's model of taxation

In the Lindahl model, Dt represents the aggregate marginal benefit curve, which is the sum of Da and Db—the marginal benefits for the two individuals in the economy. In a Lindahl equilibrium, the optimal quantity of the public good will be where the social marginal benefit intersects the marginal cost (point P). Each individual's Lindahl tax rate will be based on their own marginal benefit curve. In this model, individual B will pay the price level at R and individual A will pay at point J.

== Criticism ==
In theory, Lindahl pricing and taxation leads to an efficient provision of public goods. However, it requires the knowledge of the demand functions for each individual, and therefore is difficult to implement in practice. There are three main problems with the implementation of a Lindahl tax.

=== Preference revelation problem ===
When information about marginal benefits is available only from the individuals themselves, they tend to under report their valuation for a particular good. In doing this, an individual can lower his or her tax cost by under reporting the benefits derived from the public good or service. The incentive to lie is associated with the free rider problem; if an individual reports a lower benefit, he or she will pay less taxes, but only see a marginal decrease in the public good. This informational problem shows that survey-based Lindahl taxation is not incentive compatible. Incentives to understate or under report one's true benefits under Lindahl taxation resemble those of a traditional public goods game.

Preference revelation mechanisms can be used to solve that problem, although none of these has been shown to completely and satisfactorily address it. The Vickrey–Clarke–Groves mechanism is an example of this, ensuring true values are revealed and that a public good is provided only when it should be. The allocation of cost is taken as given and the consumers will report their net benefits (benefits-cost) the public good will be provided if the sum of the net benefits of all consumers is positive. If the public good is provided side payments will be made reflecting the fact that truth telling is costly. The side payments internalize the net benefit of the public good to other players. The side payments must be financed from outside the mechanism. In reality, preference revelation is difficult as the size of the population makes it costly both in terms of money and time.

=== Preference knowledge problem ===
A second drawback to the Lindahl solution is that individuals may be unsure of their own valuation of a public good. Even if individuals are attempting to be honest with their willingness to pay, they may have no idea of their true value. This is especially true for public goods that individuals do not interact with on a day-to-day basis, like fireworks and national defense.

=== Preference aggregation problem ===
Even if individuals know their marginal willingness to pay, and are honest in their reporting, the government can have extreme difficulties aggregating this into a social value. In situations where few individuals are affected by the public good, like the example below, aggregation can be relatively simple. However, in the case of national defense in the United States, compiling the marginal willingness to pay for this public good of each individual would be nearly impossible.

== Mathematical representation ==
We assume that there are two goods in an economy:the first one is a "public good", and the second is "everything else". The price of the public good can be assumed to be P_{public} and the price of everything else can be P_{else}. Person 1 will choose his bundle such that:

- α*P_{(public)}/P_{(else)} = MRS_{(person1)}

This is just the usual price ratio/marginal rate of substitution deal; the only change is that we multiply P_{public} by α to allow for the price adjustment to the public good. Similarly, Person 2 will choose his bundle such that:

- (1-ɑ)*P_{(public)}/P_{(else)}= MRS_{(person2)}

Now we have both individuals' utility maximizing. We know that in a competitive equilibrium, the marginal cost ratio or price ratio should be equal to the marginal rate of transformation, or

- MC_{(public)}/MC_{(else)}=[P_{(public)}/P_{(else)}]=MRT

== Example ==
Take for example a public park, with a constant marginal cost of $15 per acre. This public park will be available to two people, Sarah and Tom.

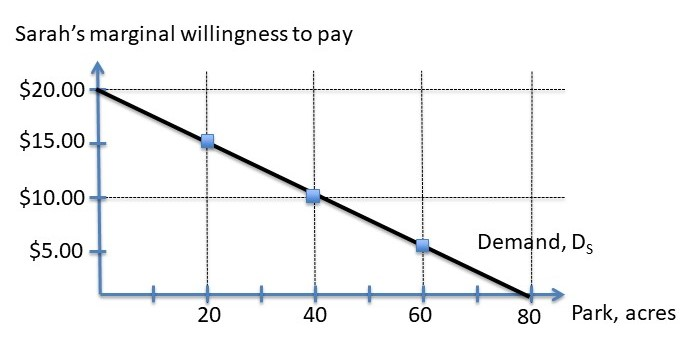
Figure 1: Sarah's marginal willingness to pay.

Figure 1 shows Sarah's marginal willingness to pay for a public park. For the first acre of the park, Sarah is willing to pay $20. For the 80th acre, her marginal willingness to pay has decreased down to zero.

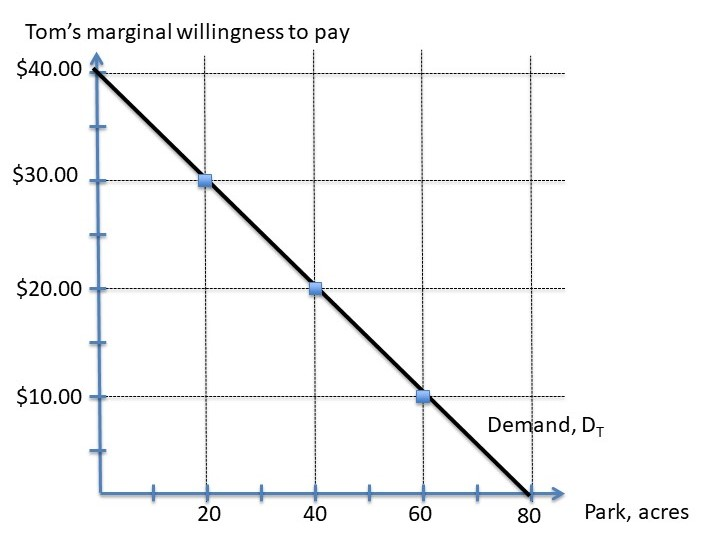
Figure 2: Tom's marginal willingness to pay.

Figure 2 shows Tom's marginal willingness to pay for a public park. Unlike Sarah, for the first acre of park he is willing to pay $40, and for the 40th acre of park he has a marginal willingness to pay of $20. For the 80th acre of park his marginal willingness to pay is zero.

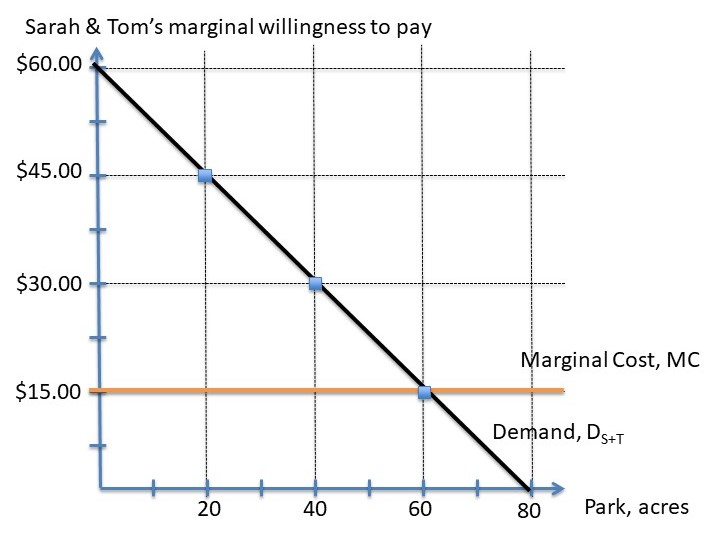
Figure 3: Aggregate marginal willingness to pay.

Figure 3 shows the aggregate marginal willingness to pay for the public park. As seen on the figure, Sarah and Tom together are willing to pay $60 for the first acre of park. This is higher than the marginal cost of the first acre ($15) and therefore this first acre of park should be produced. Sarah and Tom together are willing to pay $45 for the 20th acre, and $30 for the 40th acre, which are both again above the marginal cost of $15. The marginal cost curve intersects their aggregate willingness to pay curve at the 60th acre, when they are together willing to pay the $15 marginal cost. Thus, the Lindahl equilibrium involves charging Sarah $5 and Tom $10 for each of the 60 acres of park.

== See also ==
- Lindahl equilibrium - a state of economic equilibrium under a Lindahl tax.
- Benefit principle
- Public choice theory
- Public finance
- Samuelson condition
- Value capture

== Sources ==
=== References and further reading ===
- Foley, Duncan K. (1970), "Lindahl's Solution and the Core of an Economy with Public Goods" (PDF), Econometrica, 38 (1): 66–72, doi:10.2307/1909241, hdl:1721.1/63828, JSTOR 1909241.
- "Public Economics" by Gareth D. Myles (October 2001)
- Laffont, Jean-Jacques (1988). "2.4 Lindahl equilibrium, 2.5.3 Majority voting or the law of the median voter". Fundamentals of public economics. MIT. pp. 41–43, 51–53. ISBN 978-0-262-12127-9.
- Lindahl, Erik (1958) [1919], "Just taxation – A positive solution", in Musgrave, R. A.; Peacock, A. T. (eds.), Classics in the Theory of Public Finance, London: Macmillan.
- Salanié, Bernard (2000). "5.2.3 The Lindahl equilibrium". Microeconomics of market failures (English translation of the (1998) French Microéconomie: Les défaillances du marché (Economica, Paris) ed.). Cambridge, MA: MIT Press. pp. 74–75. ISBN 978-0-262-19443-3.
- Starrett, David A. (1988). "5 Planning mechanisms, 16 Practical methods for large project evaluation (Groves–Clarke mechanism)". Foundations of public economics. Cambridge economic handbooks. Vol. XVI. Cambridge: Cambridge University Press. pp. 65–72, 270–71. ISBN 9780521348010.
