= Theories of taxation =

Taxation process

Several theories of taxation exist in public economics. Governments at all levels (national, regional and local) need to raise revenue from a variety of sources to finance public-sector expenditures.

Adam Smith in The Wealth of Nations (1776) wrote:

"The subjects of every state ought to contribute towards the support of the government, as nearly as possible, in proportion to their respective abilities; that is, in proportion to the revenue which they respectively enjoy under the protection of the state. The expense of government to the individuals of a great nation is like the expense of management to the joint tenants of a great estate, who are all obliged to contribute in proportion to their respective interests in the estate. In the observation or neglect of this maxim consists what is called the equality or inequality of taxation." The Wealth of Nations#Book V: Of the Revenue of the Sovereign or Commonwealth

In modern public-finance literature, a whole economy of the tax system has developed (tax system economics), which can be defined as "the overall management of public revenue of a state or integration grouping's public revenues and expenditures in order to shape smart economic policies that stimulates economic growth and development and safeguards against functional risks for present and future generations." A narrower view of the theory of taxation reduces the system to two issues: who can pay and who can benefit (Benefit principle). Influential theories have been the ability theory presented by Arthur Cecil Pigou and the benefit theory developed by Erik Lindahl. There is a later version of the benefit theory known as the "voluntary exchange" theory.

Under the benefit theory, tax levels are automatically determined, because taxpayers pay proportionately for the government benefits they receive. In other words, the individuals who benefit the most from public services pay the most taxes. Here, two models adopting the benefit approach are discussed: the Lindal model and the Bowen model.

== Lindahl's model ==
Erik Lindahl was a Swedish economist and professor of economics at Uppsala University, as well as an advisor to the Swedish government and central bank. Lindahl approached the financing of public goods through the lens of individual benefits, ensuring that the total marginal utility equated to the marginal cost of their provision, thereby addressing the number of public goods.

The necessary and sufficient conditions for such an equilibrium are:

- the sum of the declared willingness be greater than the cost of the provision
- the minimum willingness to pay is positive & non-zero

Lindahl was deeply influenced by his professor and teacher Knut Wicksell and proposed a method of financing public goods that shows that consensus politics is possible. Because people are naturally different, their preferences differ, and consensus requires that each pay a slightly different tax for each service or good they consume. Suppose the price of everyone’s tax is set at the equivalent of the marginal utility he receives. In that case, everyone will be better off by the provision of the public good and may accordingly agree to be provided with that level of service.

Lindahl tries to solve three problems:

- Extent of state activity
- Allocation of the total expenditure among various goods and services
- Allocation of tax burden

=== Lindahl's model ===
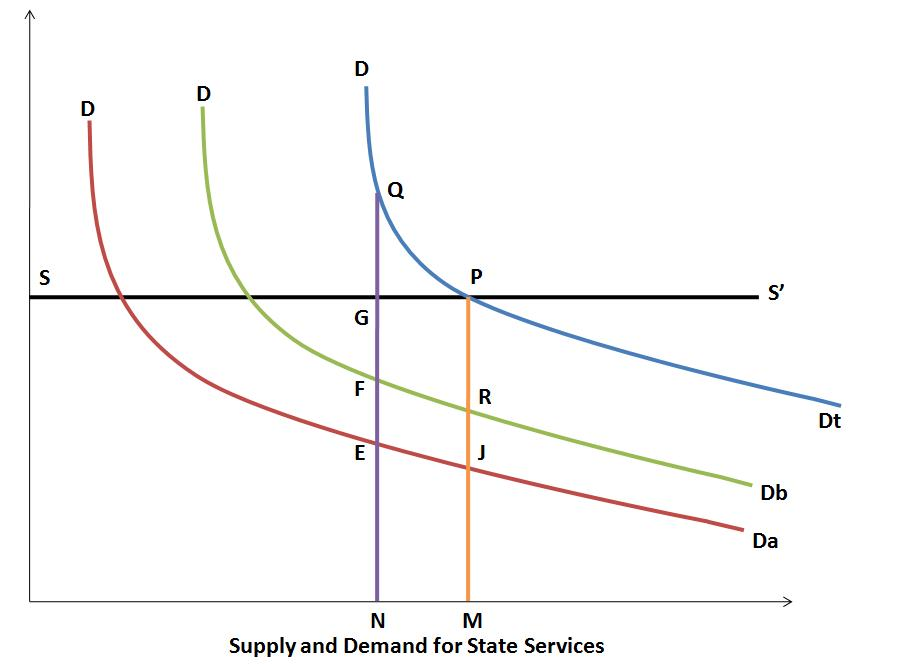
Lindahl's model

In the Lindahl model, if SS’ is the supply curve of state services it is assumed that production of social goods is linear and homogenous. DDa is the demand curve of taxpayer A, and DDb is the demand curve of taxpayer B. The Horizontal summation of the two demand curves results in the community’s total demand schedule for state services. A and B pay different proportions of the cost of the services which is vertically measured. When ON (O = graph origin, at axes intersection) is the amount of state services produced, A contributes NE and B contributes NF; the cost of supply is NG. Since the state is non-profit, it increases its supply to OM. At this level, A contributes MJ and B contributes MR (the total cost of supply). Equilibrium is reached at point P on a voluntary-exchange basis.

=== Lindahl's equilibrium ===
The Lindahl equilibrium proposes that individuals pay for the provision of a public good according to their marginal benefits in order to determine the efficient level of provision for public goods. In the equilibrium state, all individuals consume the same quantity of public goods but may face different prices because some people may value a particular good more than others. The Lindahl equilibrium price is the resulting amount paid by an individual for his or her share of the public goods.

The significance of the Lindahl equilibrium is that it satisfies Samuelson's rule and is therefore said to be Pareto efficient, even though there are public goods. It also sets out how efficiency can be achieved in an economy with public goods by using personalized prices. Personalized prices are equal to the individual estimate for the public good and the public good's cost.

=== Lindahl tax and Pareto optimality ===
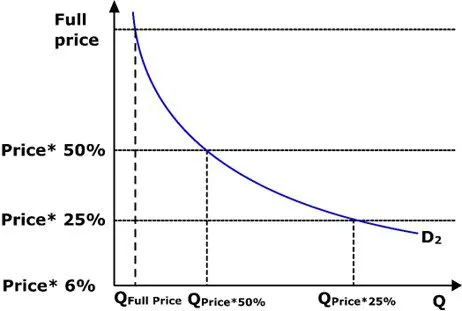
Figure 1: X's demand curve

It's essential to consider whether the Lindahl Pareto tax stands as an optimal equilibrium. A Pareto optimal allocation occurs for a public good when the sum of the marginal rates of substitution (MRS) equals the marginal rate of transformation (MRT). Thus, if this can be shown to hold in a Lindahl equilibrium, it can be conveniently said to be Pareto optimal. Demonstrating this can be achieved through the following steps: let's examine Figure 1.

Considering the demand curve for public goods. With the lower price of public goods, the X will want to consume more.

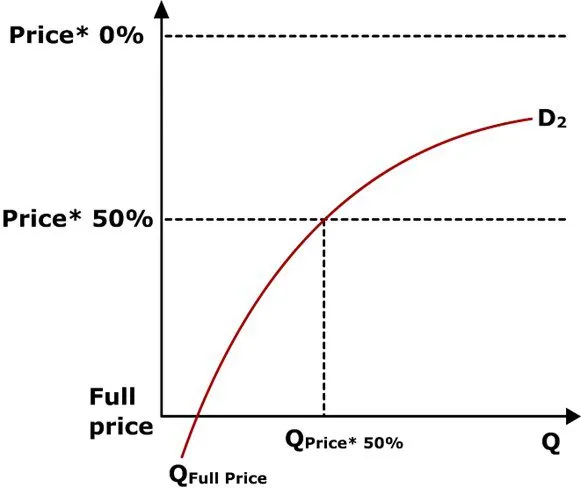
Figure 2: Y's demand curve

If we introduce a horizontal dashed line representing the full price of the public good, the demand curve suggests that X will demand a relatively small quantity. However, consider an alternative scenario: rather than the price decreasing, the proportion of the price that X is required to pay decreases. Now X sees that the price falls, so his demand for this good will rise. Now consider the demand curve of another person, let’s call it Y. Y sees the vertical axis reversed, with the full price at the bottom and the percentage decreasing as you go up. Like X, Y will demand more as his observed price falls.

Now we see that Y describes that the price is going down, which means that we are moving further on the vertical axis. The point of equilibrium is reached when both X and Y demand identical quantities of the good, which only happens at the intersection of their respective demand curves. Drawing a straight line across the price axis from this intersection, we get the percentage share for each person that is required to obtain that price.

Lindahl's tax system must ensure the Pareto optimum of the production of public goods. Another important condition that must be satisfied is that the Lindahl tax system should link the tax paid by the individual to the utility he receives. This system promotes fairness. If the tax paid by an individual is equivalent to the utility he receives, and if this link is sufficiently good, then it leads to a Pareto optimality.

=== Lindahl Pricing ===
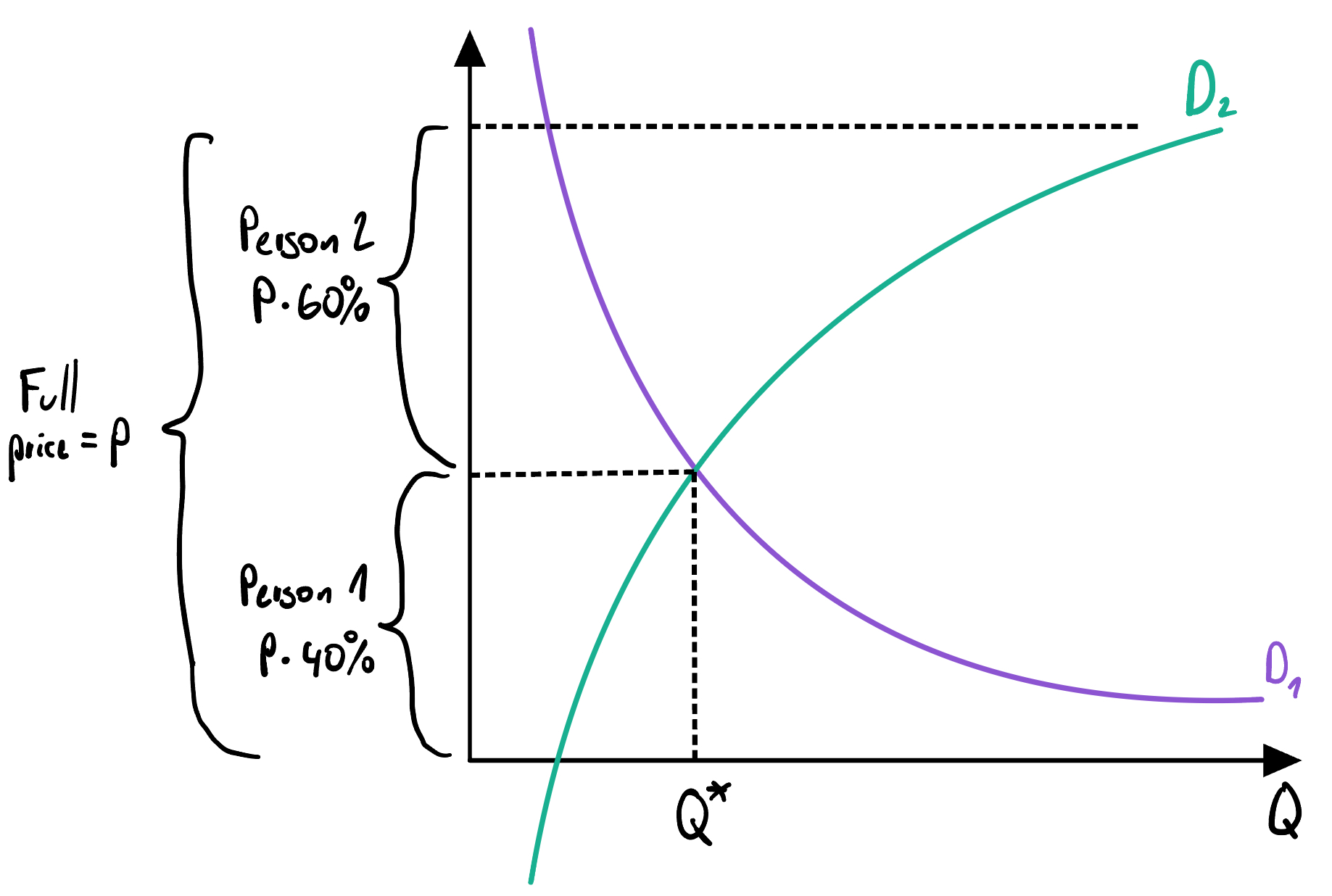
Lindahl Pricing

We can see that X is paying P⋅40% per unit, and Y is paying P⋅60% per unit, and overall the economy produces Q* units. This point is called the Lindahl equilibrium, and the corresponding prices are called Lindahl prices.

=== Mathematical representation of Lindahl ===
We assume that there are two goods in an economy: the first one is a “public good,” and the second is “everything else.” The price of the public good can be assumed to be P_{PUBLIC} and the price of everything else can be P_{ELSE}:

$$\alpha \times \frac{P_{\text{PUBLIC}}}{P_{\text{ELSE}}} = \text{MRS}_{\text{PERSON1}}$$

This is just the usual price ratio/marginal rate of substitution deal; the only change is that we multiply P_{PUBLIC} by $\alpha$ to allow for the price adjustment to the public good. Similarly, Person 2 will choose his bundle such that:

$$(1-\alpha) \times \frac{P_{\text{PUBLIC}}}{P_{\text{ELSE}}} = \text{MRS}_{\text{PERSON2}}$$

Now, we have both individuals’ utility maximizing. Moreover, in a competitive equilibrium, the marginal cost ratio (price ratio) should be equal to the marginal rate of transformation, i.e.:

$$\frac{{\text{MC}_{\text{PUBLIC}}}}{{\text{MC}_{\text{ELSE}}}} = \left[\frac{{P_{\text{PUBLIC}}}}{{P_{\text{ELSE}}}}\right] = \text{MRT}$$

=== Limitations of Lindhal’s Model ===
Lindahl's pricing runs into big issues. it's tough to spot what folks want and how much they'd pay - these things don't stand out. In addition, people might not say what they want to avoid paying, thanks to the "free rider" problem.

Take a TV antenna in one place for instance. Those nearby get a strong signal, but it gets weak for those far off. So, those close by, who don't value extra power as much, end up paying less than those who are farther and would pay more. There's another point against Lindahl pricing - it can feel wrong. Let's say there's a choice spot for a TV tower. If you live close, your signal is good; if you're far, it's bad. This means folks near the tower, valuing extra powerlessness, get a better deal, while those away get a worse one because they'd pay more.

== Bowen's model ==
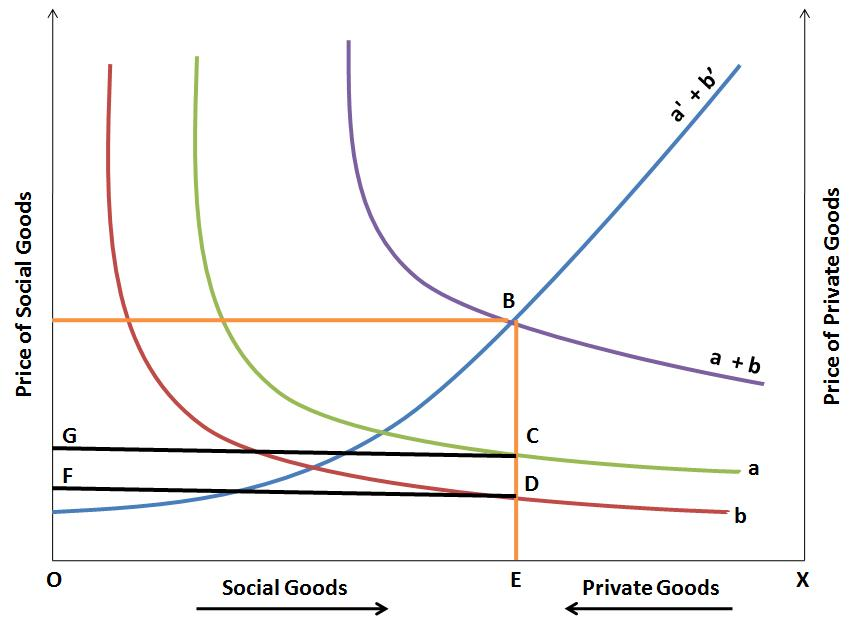
Bowen's model

Bowen’s model has more operational significance, since it demonstrates that when social goods are produced under conditions of increasing costs, the opportunity cost of private goods is foregone. For example, if there is one social good and two taxpayers (A and B), their demand for social goods is represented by a and b; therefore, a+b is the total demand for social goods. The supply curve is shown by a'+b', indicating that goods are produced under conditions of increasing cost. The production cost of social goods is the value of foregone private goods; this means that a'+b' is also the demand curve of private goods. The intersection of the cost and demand curves at B determines how a given national income should (according to taxpayers' desires) be divided between social and private goods; hence, there should be OE social goods and EX private goods. Simultaneously, the tax shares of A and B are determined by their individual demand schedules. The total tax requirement is the area (ABEO) out of which A is willing to pay GCEO and B is willing to pay FDEO.

=== Advantages and limitations ===
The advantage of the benefit theory is the direct correlation between revenue and expenditure in a budget. It approximates market behaviour in the allocation procedures of the public sector. Although simple in its application, the benefit theory has difficulties:

- It limits the scope of government activities
- Government can neither support the poor nor take steps to stabilize the economy
- Applicable only when beneficiaries can be observed directly (impossible for most public services)
- Taxation in accord with the benefit principle would leave distribution of real incomes unchanged

=== Ability-to-pay approach ===
The ability-to-pay approach treats government revenue and expenditures separately. Taxes are based on taxpayers’ ability to pay; there is no quid pro quo. Taxes paid are seen as a sacrifice by taxpayers, which raises the issues of what the sacrifice of each taxpayer should be and how it should be measured:

- Equal sacrifice: The total loss of utility as a result of taxation should be equal for all taxpayers (the rich will be taxed more heavily than the poor)
- Equal proportional sacrifice: The proportional loss of utility as a result of taxation should be equal for all taxpayers
- Equal marginal sacrifice: The instantaneous loss of utility (as measured by the derivative of the utility function) as a result of taxation should be equal for all taxpayers. This therefore will entail the least aggregate sacrifice (the total sacrifice will be the least).

Mathematically, the conditions are as follows:

- Equal absolute sacrifice=U(Y)-U(Y-T), where y=income and t=tax amount
- Equal proportional sacrifice=(U(Y)-U(Y-T))/U(Y), where U(Y)=total utility from y
- Equal marginal sacrifice=(dU(Y-T))/(d(Y-T))

== Application of Benefit Principle ==
The principle of convenience can be used to guide the design of the tax structure in the following ways:

- A general tax on benefits - taxing benefits would adjust taxes to each taxpayer's demand for public goods. Given the diversity of preferences, a universal tax formula would not be sufficient for all individuals.

The government can assess how much different consumers are willing to pay for the same amount. If taxpayers have similar taste structures, individuals with the same income will assign the same values to the same quantities.

For every one item in a pack of 1,000, the cost is Rs. 1. But, if a person makes Rs. 20,000, they'd agree to pay more, like Rs. 2. The right tax rule leans on how much folks earn and how they react to price changes when it comes to needing public stuff. If people with big paychecks respond a lot to income shifts, tax rates will climb fast as they make more. But if they're really sensitive to changes in price, this climb won't be as steep.

- Specific utility taxes - in this case, certain services are provided on a utility basis and consumers are charged fees, user charges, or tolls.
- Taxes instead of fees - In cases where direct fees are costly to impose, a tax on the free product can be used instead of fees. For example, taxes can be used in lieu of tolls on automobiles.
- Earmarking - means the allocation of revenue collected from taxes.
