= Tax increment financing (Maine) =

Local public finance tool

Tax increment financing (TIF) is a local public finance tool available to municipal governments in the state of Maine. TIF in the state of Maine refers to a program different from tax increment financing in most states. TIF in Maine refers to a process by which a local government in the state can underwrite their revenues in order to earmark tax funds and receive more funding from the state.

A significant portion of a town or city's budget in the state of Maine is determined by the revenue the state shares with the municipality. The amount that is sent to each town is determined by a formula created by the state. The formula is designed to send money to town's who have difficulty supporting themselves on their own tax base.

Tax increment financing in the state of Maine allows a town or city to define, after applying to the state, a certain region or business within its borders as a TIF district. The local tax revenues generated by that district are, one, dedicated to a specific project or economic development fund, and two, are not counted towards the municipality's total value. Since the revenue is not counted towards the municipality's total revenue, it means the state formula for revenue sharing will calculate a larger amount to share with the town because the town is perceived as less wealthy. Overall, TIF allows a town or city to increase its effective income.

== Criticisms of TIF in Maine ==
- Often the taxes generated by a TIF district are simply given back to the businesses whom they were received from; effectively this allows a town to subsidize business tax cuts with revenue from the state.
- TIF allows towns to use the district revenues for vague investment funds
- Because it takes social, political, and financial capital to use TIF and make the application process expedient wealthy towns who do not need the additional help are able to increase their revenues the most compared to more poor town who do need the additional revenue sharing.
- Since the money the state uses for revenue sharing is a fixed amount generated from all towns, when a wealthy town disproportionately uses TIF compared to poorer towns, TIF is effectively being used to siphon revenues from poor towns to wealthy towns.

== TIF on the rise in Southern Maine ==
An analysis from the Muskie School of Public Policy at the University of Southern Maine shows that the use of TIF in Maine is on the rise, particularly in smaller communities. It is theorized that this was a reaction to the 2008 recession.
