= 1929 Liechtenstein alcohol tax referendum =

- 26 May 1929
- Referendum on introducing an alcohol tax

Results
Choice	Votes	%
Yes	950	53.92%
No	812	46.08%
Valid votes	1,762	95.35%
Invalid or blank votes	86	4.65%
Total votes	1,848	100.00%
Registered voters/turnout	2,261	81.73%

A referendum on introducing an alcohol tax was held in Liechtenstein on 26 May 1929. The proposal was approved by 54% of voters.

== Results ==
Choice	Votes	%
For	950	53.92
Against	812	46.08
Total	1,762	100.00
Valid votes	1,762	95.35
Invalid/blank votes	86	4.65
Total votes	1,848	100.00
Registered voters/turnout	2,261	81.73
Source: Nohlen & Stöver
