= Ashish Goel =

Indian-American computer scientist and professor

- Born: India
- Education: (B.Tech) IIT Kanpur (PhD) Stanford University
- Awards: National Science Foundation CAREER Award
- Scientific career
- Fields: Computer Science
- Workplaces: Stanford University; Twitter
- Thesis: Algorithms for network design, routing, multicasting, and packet scheduling (1999)
- Doctoral advisor: Sergey Plotkin
- Website: Ashish Goel

Ashish Goel is an Indian-American computer scientist and professor whose research focuses on the design, analysis and applications of algorithms. He is a professor of Management Science and Engineering (and by courtesy Computer Science) at Stanford University.

== Early life and early education ==
Ashish Goel was born in Uttar Pradesh in India. He did his schooling at Uttar Pradesh including at St. Peter's, Agra. He was ranked first in IIT JEE 1990. He graduated with a B.Tech. in Computer Science from IIT Kanpur in 1994. He then went on to obtain a Ph.D. in Computer Science from Stanford University in 1999.

== Academic work ==
Ashish Goel's research has spanned algorithmic problems in several areas of computer science and computational social science including computer networks, theoretical computer science, molecular self-assembly, algorithmic game theory, and computational social choice.

Ashish Goel's early work resolved several open algorithmic problems in graph theory and computer networks including showing that the scheduling protocol FIFO can result in instability at arbitrarily low rates in a packet network; showing that matching in regular bipartite graphs can be computed in time nearly linear in the number of vertices (i.e. without looking at all the edges); showing that every monotone graph property has a sharp threshold in geometric random graphs; and showing that in a packet switch, output queuing (the gold standard) can be simulated using a fabric that is twice as fast as an input-queued switch.

Goel along with Rajeev Motwani and Gagan Aggarwal gave the first comprehensive analysis of how the auction used by Google to price search keywords can be made truthful. This work was co-awarded the ACM SigECOMM test of time award in 2018. Another paper in computational advertising received the best paper award at The Web Conference 2009. Goel was named as an ACM Fellow, in the 2024 class of fellows, "for contributions to algorithms for social networks, market design, and civic platforms, bridging theory and real-world impact".

Goel contributed to the theory of public goods allocation, particularly Lindahl equilibrium and Combinatorial participatory budgeting.

== Career ==
Goel has had made contributions to algorithms and software related to personalization, online advertising and decentralized finance, and has been associated with companies such as Twitter, Stripe, Coinbase, and Infosys as an advisor/consultant.

From 2009 to 2010, he worked for Twitter when the company was small. He designed all of Twitter's early personalization products and was credited by ex-Twitter CEO Dick Costolo for designing its monetization model. His research have also received coverage in mainstream media.

== Civic impact ==
Goel's research has focused on building software systems that enable constructive online conversation and collaboration on important, often contentious, socio-political issues.

- Applied Social Choice: Goel's work on the role of confirmation bias in increasing political polarization and the role of recommender systems in exacerbating it is widely cited. In addition to doing theoretical research in social choice, Goel has also translated this research into online platforms.The Stanford Participatory Budgeting Platform has become the de facto platform for participatory budgeting in the US, and has been used over 100 times, including major cities like New York, Boston, Seattle, and Chicago.
- Censorship vs Free Speech: Working with colleagues including the political scientist Frank Fukuyama, Goel came up with an architecture that could allow social networks such as Facebook to outsource their editorial decisions on censorship to a third party, called a "middleware". Their paper appeared in Foreign Affairs, a political science magazine, and led to discussion in the popular press.
