= User charge =

Charge for the use of a product or service

A user charge is a charge for the use of a product or service. A user charge may apply per use of the good or service or for the use of the good or service. The first is a charge for each time while the second is a charge for bulk or time-limited use.

== Government user charges ==
=== United States government user charges ===
The federal government Office of Management and Budget has set forth policies for setting user charges by the United States Government in "Circular No. A-25 Revised". Among the policies established, the government may:

- Apply user charges against identifiable recipients who enjoy special benefits derived from federal activities beyond those received by the general public;
- Set user charges sufficient to recover the full cost to the federal government of providing the service, resource or good provided by the government; and,
- Whenever possible set the charges at rates rather than fixed dollar amounts in order to adjust for changes in costs to the government or changes in market prices for provided goods, resources, or services.

=== European Environmental Agency user charges ===
The Environmental Terminology and Discovery Service (ETDS) defines a user charge as a "Charge paid for a specific environmental service provided to the charge payer. Example: treating wastewater or disposing of waste."

== See also ==
- Benefit principle
- Hypothecated tax
- London congestion charge
- Toll road
