= Internality =

An internality is the long-term benefit or cost to an individual that they do not consider when making the decision to consume a good or service. One way this is related to behavioral economics is by means of the concept of hyperbolic discounting, in which immediate consequences of a decision are disproportionately weighed compared to the future consequences. A potential cause is lack of access to full information regarding the associated costs and benefits prior to consumption. This contrasts with traditional economic theory, which makes the assumption that individuals are rational decision makers who take all personal costs into account when paying for goods and services.

One example of a positive internality is the long run effect of exercising, if these are not taken into account when deciding whether to exercise. Future benefits that an individual may not take into consideration include a diminished risk of heart disease and higher bone density. A common example of a potential negative internality is the effect of smoking cigarettes on those who smoke. For the effect of secondhand smoke, see externality. Statistically, 80% of smokers want to quit, and 54% of people who are serious about quitting fail in a week or less. This implies that they do not act in their long-term best interest due to short-term discomfort. This is also known as the self-control problem, an inability to control short-term consumption to optimize long-term consumption. Smokers also may inflict an internality on themselves due to a lack of information on the issue or myopia.

If the demand for cigarettes has a high price elasticity of demand, which evidence suggests, the government can combat the negative internality by raising taxes. Elasticity might change based on location and knowledge about the harmful health effects of smoking. In traditional economic theory, a tax diminishes the welfare of the poor because the tax burden shifts to low-income communities, as fewer can afford the good (cigarettes), and horizontal equity (economics) is distorted. However, behavioral economic theory suggests that the tax is not regressive if low-income communities have higher (healthcare) costs and more price sensitivity than individuals with higher incomes. Taxes imposed to combat internalities are most effective when they target a specific good. A tax on junk food could apply to a large variety of goods that are widely consumed, and the cost of the tax might be perceived as more detrimental than beneficial for society. Another concern with instituting this type of tax is its potential to be regressive, meaning it takes the most money from those with the least resources. For example, a tax on sugary-sweetened beverages corrects an internality, but it is also regressive, as it has been shown people with lower incomes spend more on sugary-sweetened beverages. However, it has also been shown that people who consume the most sugary-sweetened beverages have the most lack of knowledge and thus the largest internalities, so the tax may end up not harming lower-income people but benefiting them the most. A major issue with creating effective legislature against negative internalities is that the tax imposed should only reflect the cost that individuals do not factor into their consumption decisions. The difficulty in measuring individual knowledge is an obstacle to developing new policies. Another point of concern is that the group benefitting from the tax, such as smokers who want to quit, must be sizable enough to offset any backlash from tobacco companies and lobbyists.

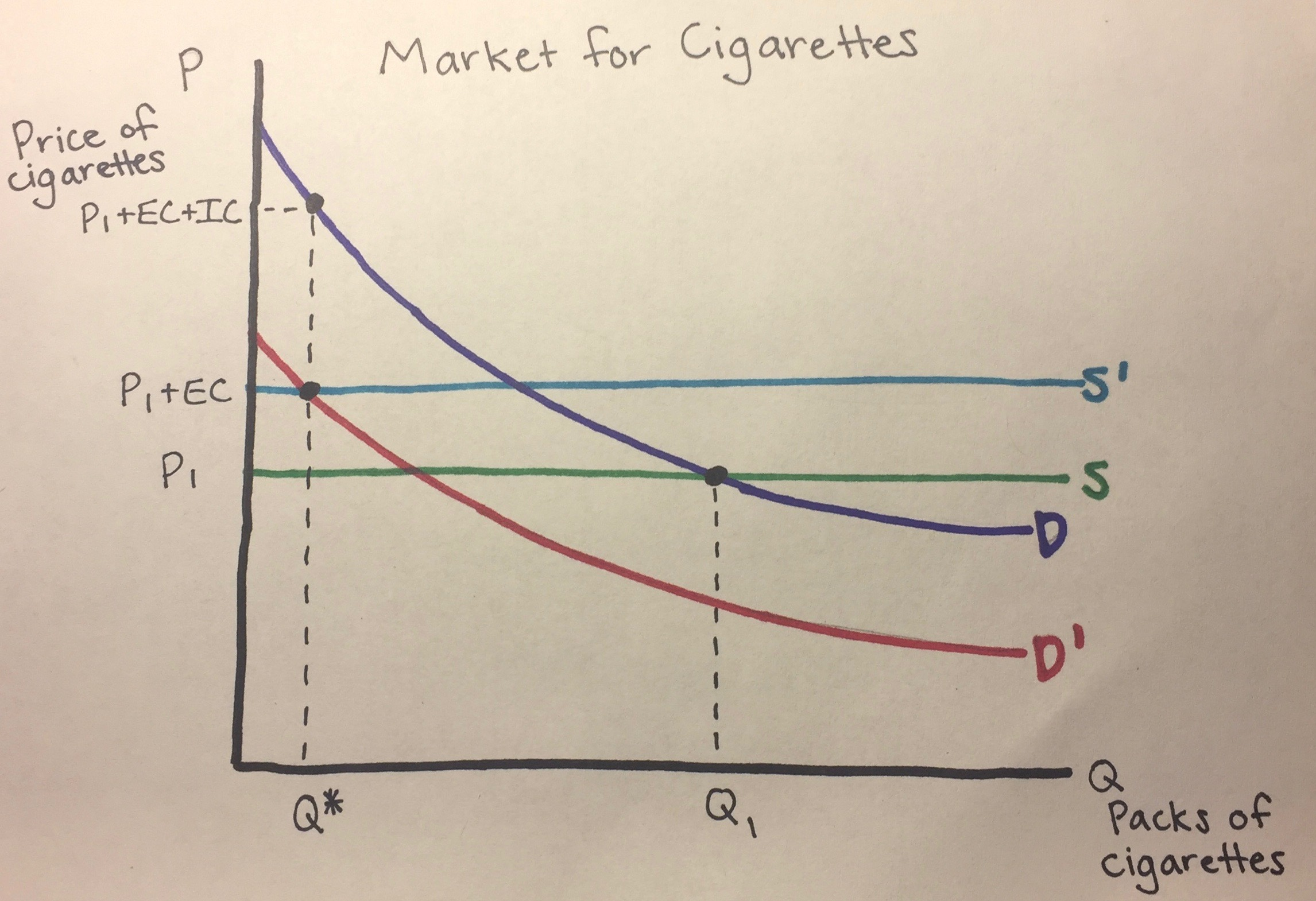
Taxing Internalities 1

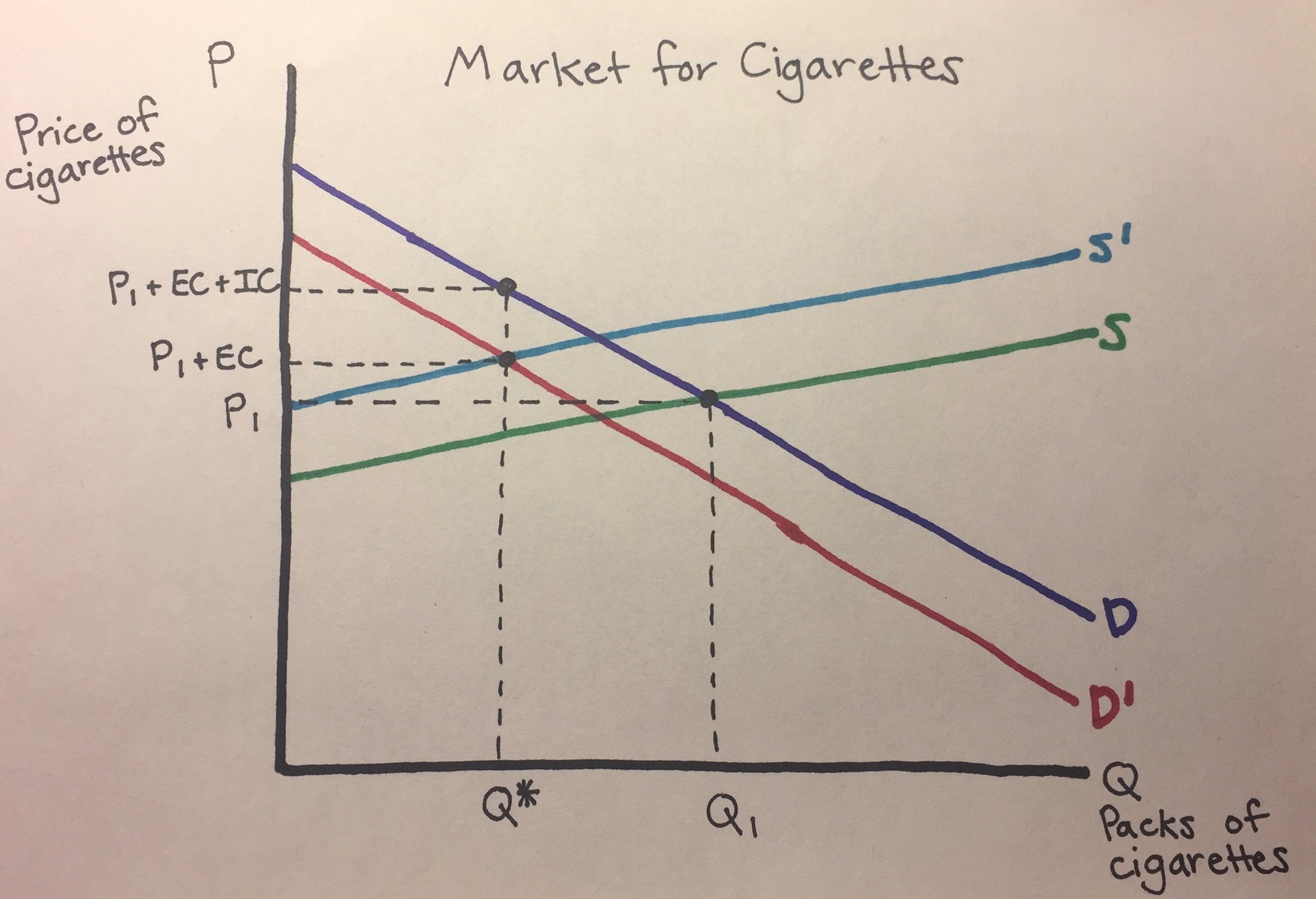
Taxing Internalities 2

In the following graphs, D' and S' are the demand and supply curves if producers and consumers take all external costs (EC) into consideration. The tax attempting to prevent the internality should be set equal to the difference between D and D' at the optimal quantity, which is the unmeasured internal cost (IC).

Increasing access to information about the costs of consuming a particular good, such as cigarettes, junk food, or sugar-sweetened beverages, is especially important. This allows people to know the costs of their actions and whether they choose to act on this knowledge is their rational decision. As a result of this, in cases where products or goods are not banned, increasing access to information may not necessarily be useful for individuals with a self-control problem.
