= Benefit principle =

Concept in the theory of taxation from public finance

The benefit principle is a concept in the theory of taxation from public finance. It bases taxes to pay for public-goods expenditures on a politically-revealed willingness to pay for benefits received. The principle is sometimes likened to the function of prices in allocating private goods. In its use for assessing the efficiency of taxes and appraising fiscal policy, the benefit approach was initially developed by Knut Wicksell (1896) and Erik Lindahl (1919), two economists of the Stockholm School. Wicksell's near-unanimity formulation of the principle was premised on a just income distribution. The approach was extended in the work of Paul Samuelson, Richard Musgrave, and others. It has also been applied to such subjects as tax progressivity, corporation taxes, and taxes on property or wealth. The unanimity-rule aspect of Wicksell's approach in linking taxes and expenditures is cited as a point of departure for the study of constitutional economics in the work of James Buchanan.

== Overview ==
Thus, considered in themselves, in their own nature, in their normal state, and apart from all abuses, public services are, like private services, purely and simply acts of exchange. - Frédéric Bastiat

The benefit principle takes a market-oriented approach to taxation. The objective is to accurately determine the optimal amount of revenue that should be spent on public goods.

- More equitable/fair because taxpayers, like consumers, would "pay for what they get"
- Taxes are more akin to prices that people would pay for government services
- Consumer sovereignty - specific rather than general...charges are more direct...so the preferences of taxpayers, rather than government planners, are given more weight
- More efficient allocation of limited resources...it is less likely that funds will be overinvested in low priority programs.
- There's no such thing as a free lunch - taxpayers would have a better understanding of the costs of public goods
- Provides the foundation for voluntary exchange theory.

== Examples ==
Here are a few of the public services that are currently funded, in some part, on the basis of the benefit principle...

- Public college tuition (only paid by the people who attend public colleges)
- National park admission fees (only paid by the people who visit public parks)
- Fuel taxes (only paid by the people who purchase fuel)
- Bus fares (only paid by the people who take the bus)
- Bridge tolls (only paid by people who use the bridge)

== Passages ==
Until people are made to bear the full costs of their decisions, those decisions are unlikely to be socially sound, in this as in other areas of public policy. - Bird, Richard M. (1976). Charging for Public Services: A New Look at an Old Idea

The doctrine of consumer sovereignty is applied to the provision of social goods in so far as the consumer buys national defence, police service, fire protection and electricity or water supply from the public sector of his own choice and according to the benefits received just as he buys food, clothes, fuel, tooth brushes and automobiles from the private producers. - P.C. Jain (1989), The Economics of Public Finance, 2nd ed., v. 1, p. 63.

== Criticism ==
The free-rider problem is the primary criticism given for limiting the scope of the benefit principle. When information about marginal benefits is available only from the individuals themselves, they tend to under report their valuation for a particular good, this gives rise to the preference revelation problem. Each individual can lower his tax cost by under reporting his benefits derived from the public good or service. One solution would be to implement tax choice. If taxpayers had to pay taxes anyway, but could choose where their taxes went (without the possibility of secret rebates or similar), then they would have no incentive to hide their true preferences.

== See also ==
- Club good
- Decentralized knowledge
- Dollar voting
- Foot voting
- Hypothecated tax
- New public management
- Opportunity cost
- Rational ignorance
- User charge
