= Alcohol in the United Kingdom =

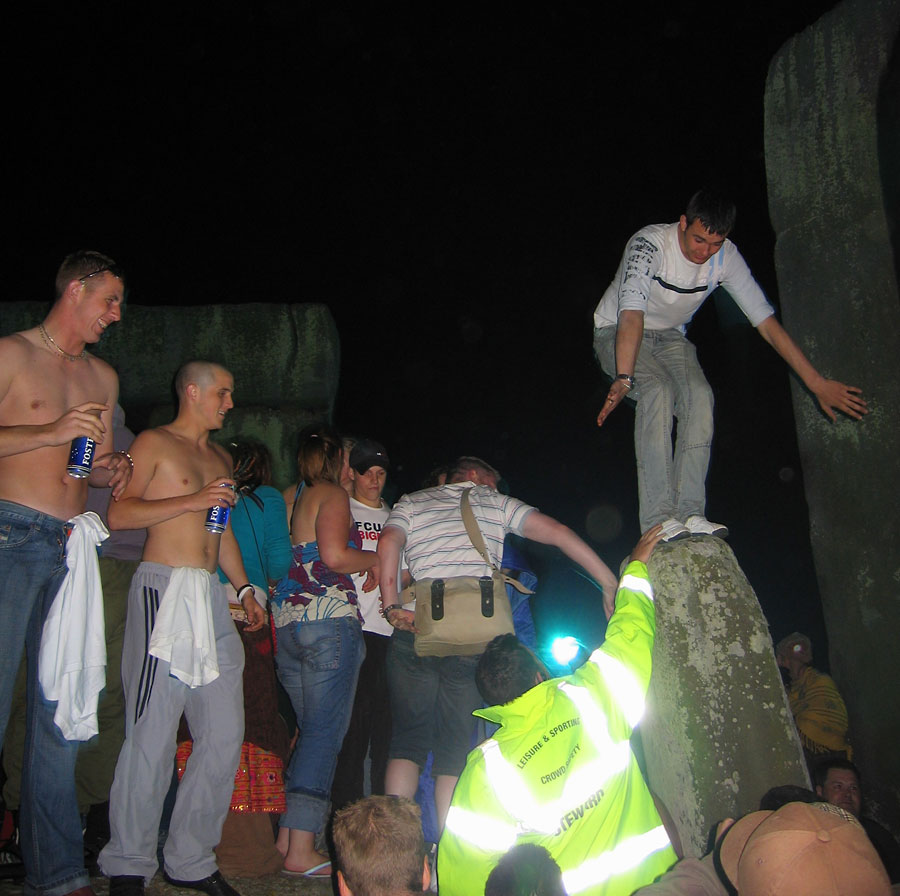
Intoxicated drinkers at Stonehenge (2005)

Alcohol in the United Kingdom is legal to buy, sell and consume. Consumption rates within the country are high among the average of OECD nations however average among European countries but consistently ranks highest on binge drinking culture. An estimated 29 million people in the United Kingdom drank alcohol in 2017.

== History ==
Evidence of historical consumption of alcohol in the United Kingdom stretches back to possibly 12,000 years ago of alcohol fermentation jugs being found.

By the 8th century the consumption of alcoholic beverages had become a "staple part of the British diet among manual workers".

=== Roman history ===
During the Roman Empire, British pub culture, in tabernae, began, combining the northern European tradition of "extremes of heavy episodic drinking" of "feast drinking", which remained untouched from Roman pressure and social drinking within bars.

=== 18th to 19th century ===
==== Health and societal perceptions ====
During the eighteenth century, alcohol was regarded as a safe substance; its regular consumption was believed to confer health benefits and was considered vital in the country's social milieu. According to Tim Murphy, although alcohol consumption in the nineteenth century did not increase, its consumption increasingly began to emerge as a societal problem and be perceived as an antecedent to social chaos and moral corruption. The onset of the Industrial Revolution is believed to have played a role in the transmutation of societal perception due to the threat drinking posed on the new economic structure reliant on the masses working in factories. Furthermore, excessive drinking was classified as a disease and became subject to medical research and treatments, whereas previously it had only elicited religious condemnation.

==== Attempts at prohibition ====
Although the sale or consumption of commercial alcohol has never been prohibited by law in the United Kingdom, historically, various groups in the UK have campaigned for the prohibition of alcohol; including the Society of Friends (Quakers), The Methodist Church and other non-conformists, as well as temperance movements such as Band of Hope, temperance Chartist movements of the nineteenth century and the United Kingdom Alliance who advocated for a legal ban of alcohol. An attempt was also made during the First World War which was due to consumption of alcohol by the army. Legislation passed which had a prohibitionist agenda was the Sale of Beer Act 1854 which restricted Sunday opening hours however this was repealed following widespread rioting in conjunction, another attempt was made in 1859 with a prototype prohibition bill but this was overwhelmingly defeated in the House of Commons.

=== 20th to 21st century ===
In the 1930s, the book 'The Pub and the People' was produced by a group of observers who went to observe life in a normal British pub and to come back and report on the culture and activities in working class life.

In 2004, alcohol consumption peaked at an all time high of 11.6 litres which was around double than in 1954.

== Consumption rates ==
Consumption rates for alcohol in the United Kingdom are high along the general trend of OECD nations.

However the disparity between general consumers and people who consume alcohol more than the regular is stark; around 4.4% of drinkers in the entire UK drink around 1/3rd of all alcohol consumed in the country in 2018.

=== Consumption ===
Alcohol consumption rate

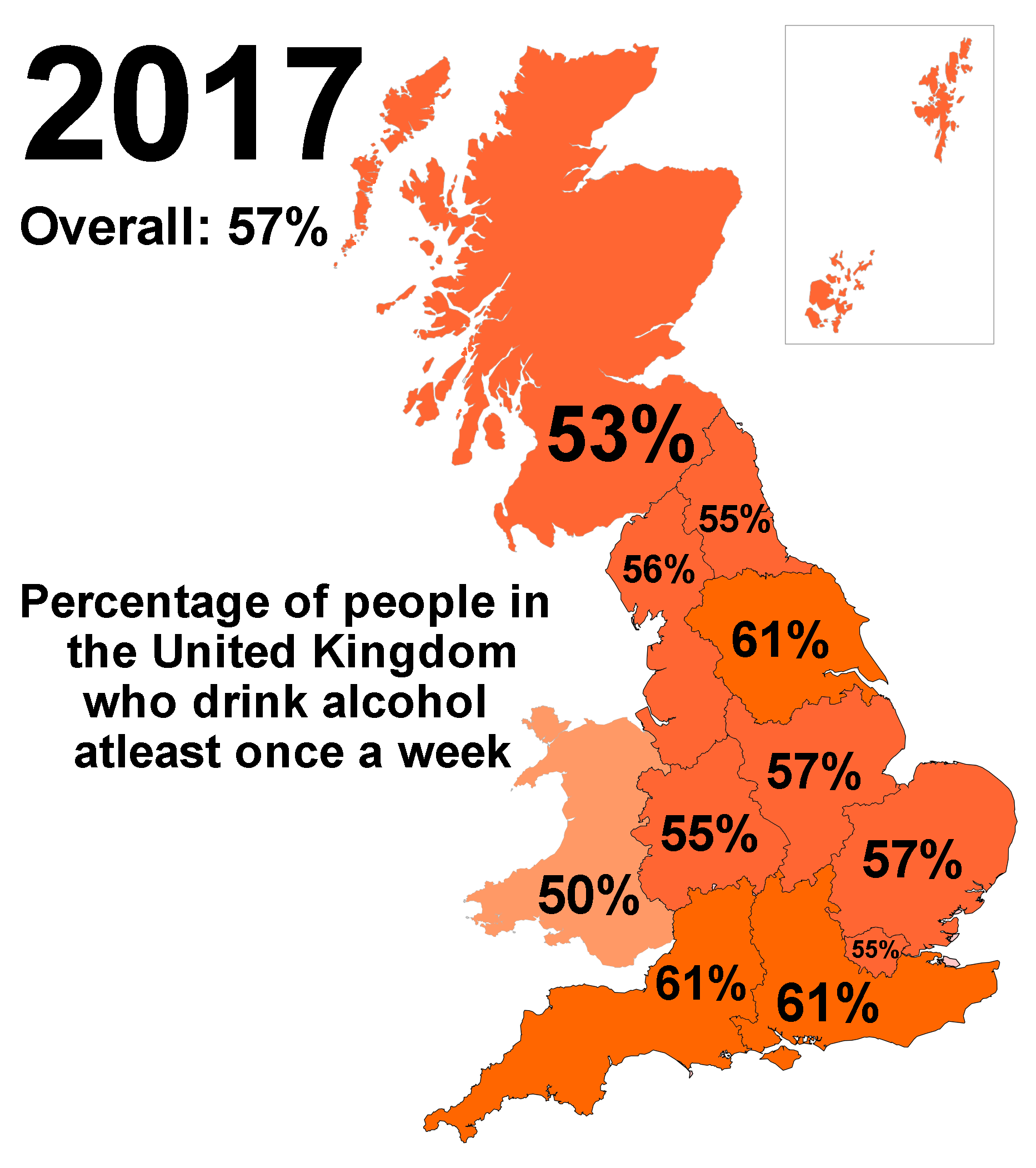
Percentage of people in who at-least drank the week being surveyed regionally

Alcohol expenditure as a share of total household income

=== Binge drinking ===
Heavy binge drinking is well established in Britain and the country consistently ranks highest for binge drinking culture in health reports.

The percentage of people binge drinking varies slightly from constituent country to country, In England in 2019 this was 15%, Wales; 14% and Scotland 18%.

==== Cost ====
Binge drinking costs the UK economy approximately £20 billion a year; 17 million working days are estimated to be lost due to hangovers and drink-related illness each year. The cost of binge drinking to employers is estimated to be £6.4 billion and the cost per year of alcohol harm is estimated to cost the National Health Service £2.7 billion. Urgent action has been recommended to understand the binge drinking culture and its aetiology and pathogenesis and urgent action has been called for to educate people with regard to the dangers of binge drinking.

=== Teetotal ===
People who do not drink alcohol (teetotal) are a rising percentage of people in the UK, especially amongst younger generations, standing at 20% of the population. This percentage varies through the constituent countries of the UK, in England in 2019, this percentage is 20%, Scotland; 17%, Wales; 20% and Northern Ireland; 19%. In numerical terms, this equates to 10.4 million people.

=== Death and disorder rate ===
Deaths due to alcohol consumption have historically risen since the 1990s. In 2020, this has peaked in a 20-year high for England and Wales.

Share who drank on 5 or more days by income

Share of drinkers who "binged" on heaviest day of drinking in last week

Rate of premature deaths due to alcohol UK

Deaths in age brackets

Death rates from alcohol use disorders

Share of population with alcohol use disorders

Alcohol disorders age-standardized rate

== Type of drinks ==
Consumption of different types of alcohol per person

Alcohol consumption by type of alcoholic beverage

Beer consumption

Wine consumption

Spirits consumption

The United Kingdom has historically been a beer consuming country however from the 1960s onwards, the consumption of wine has increased in prevalence. This increase in consumption has largely come from women, According to the Institute of Alcohol Studies, 7 out of 10 wine bottles sold in supermarkets are purchased by women.

=== Beer ===
Historically, beer has been the most popular choice of drink in Britain, but since the 1960s and more prominently the 1980s; wine consumption has mostly taken up beer's previous market domination within the UK.

In 2018, beer consumption once again became the most consumed type of alcohol within the UK with 8.5 billion pints sold in the year while wine had a total of 7.4 billion 175ml glasses worth sold and cider selling 1.2 billion pints.

=== Cider ===
Cider is also a popular drink within the United Kingdom with the country being the biggest producer of cider within Europe. The UK also is the world's biggest consumer of cider brands. In 2018, a total of 1.2 billion pints of cider were sold in the UK. Traditionally, the drink was made from apples, but is not uncommon for several other fruits to be used in cider production, including but not limited to; pears, kiwifruit, strawberries, raspberries, peaches, blueberries, pineapples, oranges, blackberries and passion fruit.

=== Wine ===
Wine within the United Kingdom has become a more popular choice of beverage within recent decades.

Production of wine with the United Kingdom compared with recent consumption is quite low but has increased steadfast since the 1990s. In 2008, production of wine was around 1.34 million bottles which doubled to 3.17 million the following year in 2009. In 2018, a record number had been reached of 15.6m bottles being produced in England and Wales.

Wine had a total of 7.4 billion 175ml glasses worth sold in 2018.

=== Spirits ===
Spirits have historically since the nineteenth century, been roughly consumed at the same rate over time in the UK.

British spirits charged for consumption in England and Wales (in thousands of gallons):163
Year	Consumption
1684	527
1700	1,223
1710	2,201
1720	2,483
1730	3,778
1741	7,429
1743	8,203 (peak)
1750	6,603
1760	1,819

Consumption of spirits per head in the UK, 1800–1914:167
Year	Home	Imported	Total
1800 - 04	0.49	0.31	0.8
1805 - 9	0.6	0.25	0.85
1810 - 14	0.61	0.23	0.84
1815 - 19	0.52	0.17	0.69
1820 - 24	0.51	0.17	0.68
1825 - 29	0.9	0.2	1.10
1830 - 34	0.91	0.2	1.17
1835 - 39	0.99	0.18	0.87
1840 - 44	0.74	0.13	0.96
1845 - 49	0.81	0.15	1.08
1850 - 54	0.9	0.18	0.99
1855 - 59	0.82	0.17	0.99
1860 - 64	0.68	0.19	0.87
1865 - 69	0.71	0.26	0.97
1870 - 74	0.84	0.30	1.14
1875 - 79	0.89	0.32	1.21
1880 - 84	0.81	0.24	1.05
1885 - 89	0.72	0.22	0.94
1890 - 94	0.79	0.21	1
1895 - 99	0.82	0.21	1.03
1900 - 04	0.84	0.2	1.04
1905 - 9	0.71	0.15	0.86
1910 - 14	0.55	0.12	0.67

Consumption of spirits in the UK, 1955–95 per person in pints:176
Year	Consumption
1955 - 59	2.7
1960 - 64	3.3
1965 - 69	3.7
1970 - 74	4.7
1975 - 79	6.4
1980 - 84	6.3
1985 - 89	6.6
1990 - 95	5.9

In 2017, drinkers were roughly spending £1,500 on mostly premium spirits.

== Popular brands ==
Popular brands of alcohol in the United Kingdom include;

Popularity of beer and ciders
Brands	Q2 2022	
Brands	YouGov polling	
Brands	Fame (Note: 'Fame' on the YouGov website is a total percentage of how many people have heard of said brand.)	Popularity (Note: 'Popularity' on the YouGov website is based on what percentage of the population gave a favourable/positive opinion of said brand.)
Guinness	97%	56%
Stella Artois	96%	51%
Kopparberg	75%	49%
Magners	85%	47%
San Miguel	88%	47%
Bulmers	86%	45%
Peroni	78%	45%
Kronenbourg 1664	88%	45%
Corona	91%	43%
Heineken	96%	43%
Carlsberg	94%	43%
Strongbow	89%	43%
Thatchers Gold	78%	41%
Old Speckled Hen	74%	40%
Foster's	90%	39%
Carling	93%	38%
Beck's	87%	38%
Sol	75%	38%
Strongbow (Dark Fruits)	76%	37%
Amstel	82%	37%

Popularity of alcohol brands
Brands	Q2 2022	
Brands	YouGov polling	
Brands	Fame (Note: 'Fame' on the YouGov website is a total percentage of how many people have heard of said brand.)	Popularity (Note: 'Popularity' on the YouGov website is based on what percentage of the population gave a favourable/positive opinion of said brand.)
Baileys	94%	55%
Malibu	95%	53%
Smirnoff	94%	51%
Bacardi	95%	51%
Jack Daniels	95%	47%
Pimm's	91%	46%
Martini	92%	46%
Beefeater	94%	45%
Blossom Hill	81%	45%
Dom Pérignon	82%	45%

== Price ==
Affordability of alcohol overtime on a per capita basis from 1987

=== Price ===
The price of alcohol has gradually become more affordable overtime on a per capita basis. This price varies from location in the UK, in London the average price of a pint is £5.20 while across the UK as a whole it is £3.50.

=== Sales ===
Alcohol sales fell in 2020 due to the closure of pubs during the COVID-19 pandemic.

The average spend on alcohol per person per week in 2020 was £7.43 across the entire UK, which was 10% higher than in 2017.

== Law ==
Alcohol licensing laws have changed over time and vary between constituent countries of the UK but generally remain consistent.

If you’re under 18, it’s against the law:

- for someone to sell you alcohol
- to buy or try to buy alcohol
- for an adult to buy or try to buy alcohol for you
- to drink alcohol in licensed premises (such as a pub or restaurant)

However, if you’re 16 or 17 and accompanied by an adult, you can drink (but not buy) beer, wine or cider with a meal.

If you’re 16 or under, you may be able to go to a pub (or premises primarily used to sell alcohol) if you’re accompanied by an adult. However, this isn’t always the case. It can also depend on the specific conditions for that premises.

It’s illegal to give alcohol to children under 5.

— GOV.UK

== Societal impact ==
Alcohol has had a societal impact on the UK culturally and economically. Heavy binge drinking is well established in Britain and the country consistently ranks highest for binge drinking culture in health reports.[1][2]

=== Economy ===
The UK alcohol industry makes up around 2.5% of the country's total GDP to national income which equates to a contribution of £46 billion a year, in employment, the industry is responsible for 770,000 jobs which is 2.5% of all employment in the country.

== See also ==
- List of countries by alcohol consumption per capita
