= Duncan K. Foley =

American economist (born 1942)

- Born: June 15, 1942 (age 84); Columbus, Ohio, US

Academic background
- Education: Swarthmore College (B.A., Mathematics, 1964); Yale University (Ph.D., Economics, 1966)
- Doctoral advisor: Herbert Scarf; James Tobin
- Influences: Karl Marx, Michel Aglietta, Louis Althusser, Étienne Balibar, Ladislaus Bortkiewicz, Nikolai Bukharin, Samuel Bowles, Maurice Dobb, William Baumol, Luigi Pasinetti, Erik Lindahl

Academic work
- Discipline: Economics
- School or tradition: Marxian economics
- Institutions: New School of Social Research and Santa Fe Institute
- Doctoral students: John Broome
- Website: Information at IDEAS / RePEc

Duncan K. Foley (born June 15, 1942) is an American economist.

He is the Leo Model Professor of Economics at the New School for Social Research and an External Professor at the Santa Fe Institute. Previously, he was associate professor of economics at MIT and Stanford, and Professor of Economics at Columbia University (Barnard College and Columbia University Graduate Faculty of Arts and Sciences). He has held visiting professorships at Woodrow Wilson School at Princeton University, UC Berkeley, and Dartmouth College, as well as the New School for Social Research (in 1995, prior to his permanent position starting in 1999).

Foley has served on the Nominating Committee of the American Economics Association (1990).

His most-cited work was on Marxian economics and value theory, in particular his seminal book that put Das Kapital in a modern form, offering an accessible and rigorous introduction to Marx's thought – this work disrupted his path to tenure.

However, at length he provides treatments of the history and theory of economics encompassing John Maynard Keynes, Hyman Minsky, David Ricardo, Jean-Baptiste Say, Adam Smith, and Piero Sraffa. Indeed, his work ranges across such topics as economics, physics, ecology, money, complexity and statistical reasoning, and problems of social coordination. Foley has contributed to political economy and public finance, monetary economics, global environmental economic policy and technological innovation, econometrics, Bayesian statistics and foundations for choice of theory, information theory, complex systems theory (thermodynamics / statistical mechanics) and economics (as well as classical political theory), statistical equilibrium economic modeling, economic dynamics, and other macroeconomics (including growth theory, business cycle theory and the theory of distribution). In the field of fair division, he is considered the first to introduce the concept of envy-free resource allocation.

== Awards and recognition ==
- 2015 Leontief Award, Global Development And Environment Institute, Tufts University
- 2013 Social Fairness and Economics: Essays in the Spirit of Duncan Foley
- Gildersleeve Lecturer, Barnard College of Columbia University, 2009
- Schumpeter Lectures, University of Graz, 2001
- International Who's Who of Economics
- Ford Foundation Faculty Research Professor, 1969-70

== Selected publications ==
- 2010 "What's wrong with the fundamental existence and welfare theorems?", Journal of Economic Behavior and Organization 75
- 2009, “The economic fundamentals of global warming” in Jonathan M. Harris and Neva R. Goodwin (eds.), Twenty-first Century Macroeconomics: Responding to the Climate Challenge Edward Elgar Publishing
- 2008, Adam’s Fallacy: A Guide to Economic Theology. Cambridge MA: Harvard University Press
- 2003, Unholy Trinity: Labor, Capital, and Land in the New Economy, London: Routledge
- 1999, co-author with Thomas R. Michl Growth and Distribution, Cambridge MA: Harvard University Press (Japanese trans., 2002)
- 1998, co-editor (and contributor) with Peter S. Albin, Barriers and Bounds to Rationality: Essays on Economic Complexity and Dynamics in Interactive Systems, Princeton: Princeton University Press
- 1994, "A Statistical Equilibrium Theory of Markets," Journal of Economic Theory 62:2
- 1990, "Recent Developments in Economic Theory," Social Research 57:3
- 1986, Understanding Capital: Marx's Economic Theory, Cambridge MA: Harvard University Press (Japanese trans., 1988; Italian trans., 1994)
- 1986, Money, Accumulation and Crisis, London/New York: Harwood Academic (Japanese trans., 1988; Italian trans., 1994)
- 1982, "The Value of Money, the Value of Labor Power, and the Marxian Transformation Problem". Review of Radical Political Economics. 14 (2): 37–46. 1982. doi:10.1177/048661348201400204. S2CID 154598942.
- 1971, co-author with Miguel Sidrauski, Monetary and Fiscal Policy in a Growing Economy, New York: Macmillan (Japanese trans., 1974)
- 1967, "Lindahl's Solution and the Core of an Economy with Public Goods", Econometrica, 38:1, pp. 66–72
- 1967, "Resource allocation and the public sector," Yale Economic Essays 7:1, pp. 45–98.

== See also ==
- Capital accumulation
- Temporal single-system interpretation
- On the Principles of Political Economy and Taxation
