= Leif Johansen =

Norwegian economist

Leif Johansen (11 May 1930 – 29 December 1982) was a Norwegian economist who made a substantial contribution to economic science.

He was born in Eidsvoll. Throughout his academic career Johansen was employed at the University of Oslo. He was a member of the Norwegian Academy of Science and Letters. Johansen was a lifelong communist, a central board member of the Communist Party of Norway for twelve years, and was therefore never able to visit the United States, in spite of his many positions and contacts as a researcher.

== Bibliography ==
- A Multi-sectoral Study of Economic Growth (1960)
- Production Functions. An integration of Micro and Macro, Short Run and Long Run Aspects, North-Holland Publ. Co., Amsterdam, 274 pp. (1972)
- Lectures on Macroeconomic Planning, 2 bd., Amsterdam 1977–78
