= Willingness to pay =

Maximum price at or below which a consumer will buy one unit of a product

In behavioral economics, willingness to pay (WTP) is the maximum price at or below which a consumer will definitely buy one unit of a product. This corresponds to the standard economic view of a consumer reservation price. Some researchers, however, conceptualize WTP as a range.

According to the constructed preference view, consumer willingness to pay is a context-sensitive construct; that is, a consumer's WTP for a product depends on the concrete decision context. For example, consumers tend to be willing to pay more for a soft drink in a luxury hotel resort in comparison to a beach bar or a local retail store.

== Experimental context ==
In laboratory experiments auctions are conducted, a premise of the experiment is often that "bid = WTP".

== See also ==
- Cost-benefit analysis
- Lindahl tax
- Welfare economics
