= Hypothecated tax =

Dedicating a revenue stream to a certain purpose, in public finance

The hypothecation of a tax (also known as the ring-fencing or earmarking of a tax) is the dedication of the revenue from a specific tax for a particular expenditure purpose. This approach differs from the classical method according to which all government spending is done from a consolidated fund.

== History ==
Hypothecated taxes have a long history. One of the first examples of earmarking was ship money, the tax paid by English seaports used to finance the Royal Navy. Later, in the 20th century, the hypothecated tax began to be discussed by politicians in the United Kingdom. For example, the Vehicle Excise Duty from 1920 when earned revenues were used for the construction and maintenance of the roads, assigning 1p on the income tax directly to education in 1992, or giving £300 million per year from the revenues from taxes on the tobacco industry to help the fight against smoking-related diseases since 1999.

== Types of hypothecated tax ==
The hypothecated tax can be divided into three groups based on the main characteristics. The emphasis can be put on the final use of the revenues, on the vastness of the area financed from the money earned or on the type of the tax. Each group then has two subsections. In the first case, we distinguish between strong and weak hypothecation. Strong hypothecation means that the revenues from the tax go only to financing the particular service and the service is financed only through the revenues from this tax. Strong hypothecation is thought to be appropriate for pure public goods where voters must reveal their consumption preferences. If at least one of the two conditions is not met, we say that the hypothecation is weak. This distinction is the most common as many of the arguments for and against hypothecated tax are based on it.

Secondly, differentiation is made between wide and narrow hypothecation. When the tax revenues finance the entire public service such as the health care, it is described as wide hypothecation. Narrow hypothecation means that only a specific area such as nursery education is funded.

The third level of splitting is based on the type of, and the reason for imposing, the tax that is hypothecated.

The most supported type is a combination of strong and narrow hypothecation. In this case, the hypothecation can serve as a beneficial link between demand and supply. An example can be financing the roads in the U.S. by the gasoline tax.

== Benefits ==
There are three main ideas of which benefits hypothecation can bring: believing that people will be willing to pay more for better services; demonstrating the real cost of services to people; and supporting democracy. These can be broken down into four main hypothecation-supporting points.

- Transparency – Hypothecated taxation makes the link between revenues from taxes and government spending more visible and consumers may be better able to decide how much they are willing to pay.
- Accountability and trust – Hypothecated taxes may help when the government is not trusted. With hypothecation, it will have to follow a plan made in advance and will have no flexibility.
- Public support – The knowledge that the money paid on taxes will go directly to some needed service (e.g. health care) can help to reduce the dissatisfaction of the population with an increase in taxes.
- Protecting resources – Earmarking can protect resources for financing services (such as health care) from being spent in other areas.

== Criticism ==
The arguments against earmarking come mostly from the traditional way of viewing the taxes where they were confined to compulsory, unrequited payments to the general government as defined by the OECD in 1988. Firstly, public spending should be determined by policies and not by the amount of the revenue raised. With earmarking, inappropriate funding levels may occur as the strong hypothecated tax implies the dependence of spending on the tax revenues and thus on the macroeconomic performance of the country. Secondly, the flexibility of fiscal policy and thus the ability to influence the economic situation is reduced when hypothecation is used.

In 2012, the Mercatus Center pointed out the negative effects that dedicating tax revenues to specific expenditures can have on the policymakers. In their report they stated that hypothecation can be used to mask the increases in total government spending.

== Examples ==
The problem of ambiguity of hypothecation occurs in many countries all over the world. As mentioned before, revenues of hypothecated taxes are often used to finance health care or education because in these sectors the aggregate preference can be easily revealed.

One of the most known cases of hypothecation in Europe is the National Insurance contribution in the United Kingdom. Money that is raised goes directly to the National Insurance Fund from which the benefits are paid. This is also an example of the combination of wide and weak earmarking. (In practice, National Insurance today funds general government expenditures, for after accounting for health spending there is a large surplus which is loaned to the Consolidated Fund.)

The health care system is also often supported by taxes on tobacco, as smoking is considered a serious threat. For example, in Egypt, the revenue earned from these taxes is used to help to cover health insurance and provide prevention and rehabilitation for students. Besides the United Kingdom and Egypt, hypothecation helps to finance health care in many countries including Finland, the Republic of Korea, Portugal, Thailand and Belgium.

An example from a different sector is television licences. People who use television sets to receive broadcast transmissions can be obliged to pay an annual fee (depending on local laws) and the revenues can be used to fund public broadcasting. In the United Kingdom, the funds raised are dedicated to the BBC, but this type of hypothecation is also applied in many European countries.

== See also ==
- Earmark (politics)
- Motivation, Agency, and Public Policy
- Benefit principle
- Bundling (public choice)
- Consumer sovereignty
- Hypothec
- Tax choice
- The Other Invisible Hand
- User charge
- Fungibility
