= Neil Gandal =

Professor of Economics

- Education: Miami University (BS, BA); University of Wisconsin–Madison (MA); University of California, Berkeley (PhD)
- Known for: Research on network effects, technology standards, and cryptocurrency markets
- Scientific career
- Fields: Industrial organization, digital economics, economics of cybersecurity, cryptocurrencies
- Workplaces: Tel Aviv University; University of Tulsa

Neil Gandal is an economist known for his research on network effects, technology standardization, and the economics of cybersecurity and cryptocurrencies. He is the Henry Kaufman Professor in International Capital Markets at the Berglas School of Economics at Tel Aviv University, where he is professor emeritus, and the Applied Distinguished Professor of Cyber Studies at the University of Tulsa.

== Education ==
Gandal received a B.S. in mathematics and a B.A. in economics from Miami University in 1979, an M.A. in statistics from the University of Wisconsin–Madison in 1981, and a Ph.D. in economics from the University of California, Berkeley in 1989.

== Career ==
Gandal began his academic career as an assistant professor of Finance and Economics at Boston University (1989–1992) before joining Tel Aviv University in 1991. At Tel Aviv University he served as chair of the Department of Public Policy (2002–2007), head of the School of Government and Policy (2007–2012), head of the Berglas School of Economics (2012–2016), and head of the Pinhas Sapir Center for Development (2020–2025). He has held visiting positions at the University of Texas at Austin and the Haas School of Business at UC Berkeley.

Since 2018 he has held the Henry Kaufman Chair in International Capital Markets at Tel Aviv University. He has been a research fellow of the Centre for Economic Policy Research (CEPR) since 1999.

Gandal served as managing editor of the International Journal of Industrial Organization from 2005 to 2012 and in 2013 was named the journal's first honorary editor. He was an associate editor of Management Science from 2018 to 2024.

== Research ==
Gandal's early research provided some of the first empirical evidence of network effects in technology markets, including studies of the computer spreadsheet market and of standards competition in hardware/software systems such as compact disc players and the DVD–DIVX format war. His later work has focused on the economics of cybersecurity and cryptocurrency markets, including a widely cited study of price manipulation in the Bitcoin ecosystem published in the Journal of Monetary Economics. The study was cited by the U.S. Securities and Exchange Commission in its 2018 order disapproving a proposed bitcoin exchange-traded fund. His current research primarily focuses on the economics of cybersecurity.

His work has been cited nearly 10,000 times according to Google Scholar, as of August 2026.

== Selected publications ==
- Church, Jeffrey; Gandal, Neil (1992). "Network Effects, Software Provision, and Standardization". Journal of Industrial Economics. 40 (1): 85–104.
- Gandal, Neil (1994). "Hedonic Price Indexes for Spreadsheets and an Empirical Test for Network Externalities". RAND Journal of Economics. 25 (1): 160–170.
- Dranove, David; Gandal, Neil (2003). "The DVD vs. DIVX Standard War: Empirical Evidence of Network Effects and Preannouncement Effects". Journal of Economics and Management Strategy. 12 (3): 363–386.
- Gandal, Neil; Hamrick, JT; Moore, Tyler; Oberman, Tali (2018). "Price Manipulation in the Bitcoin Ecosystem". Journal of Monetary Economics. 95: 86–96.
- Halaburda, Hanna; Haeringer, Guillaume; Gans, Joshua S.; Gandal, Neil (2022). "The Microeconomics of Cryptocurrencies". Journal of Economic Literature. 60 (3): 971–1013.
- Gandal, Neil; Moore, Tyler; Riordan, Michael; Barnir, Noa (2023). "Empirically evaluating the effect of security precautions on cyber incidents". Computers & Security. 133: 103380.
