= Twiki (disambiguation) =

Twiki or TWiki may refer to:

- Twiki (robot), in the TV series Buck Rogers in the 25th Century
- TWiki, a Perl-based structured wiki application
  - TWIKI.NET, a company that supports TWiki by Rod Beckstrom and Peter Thoeny
