= Chen Long (finance) =

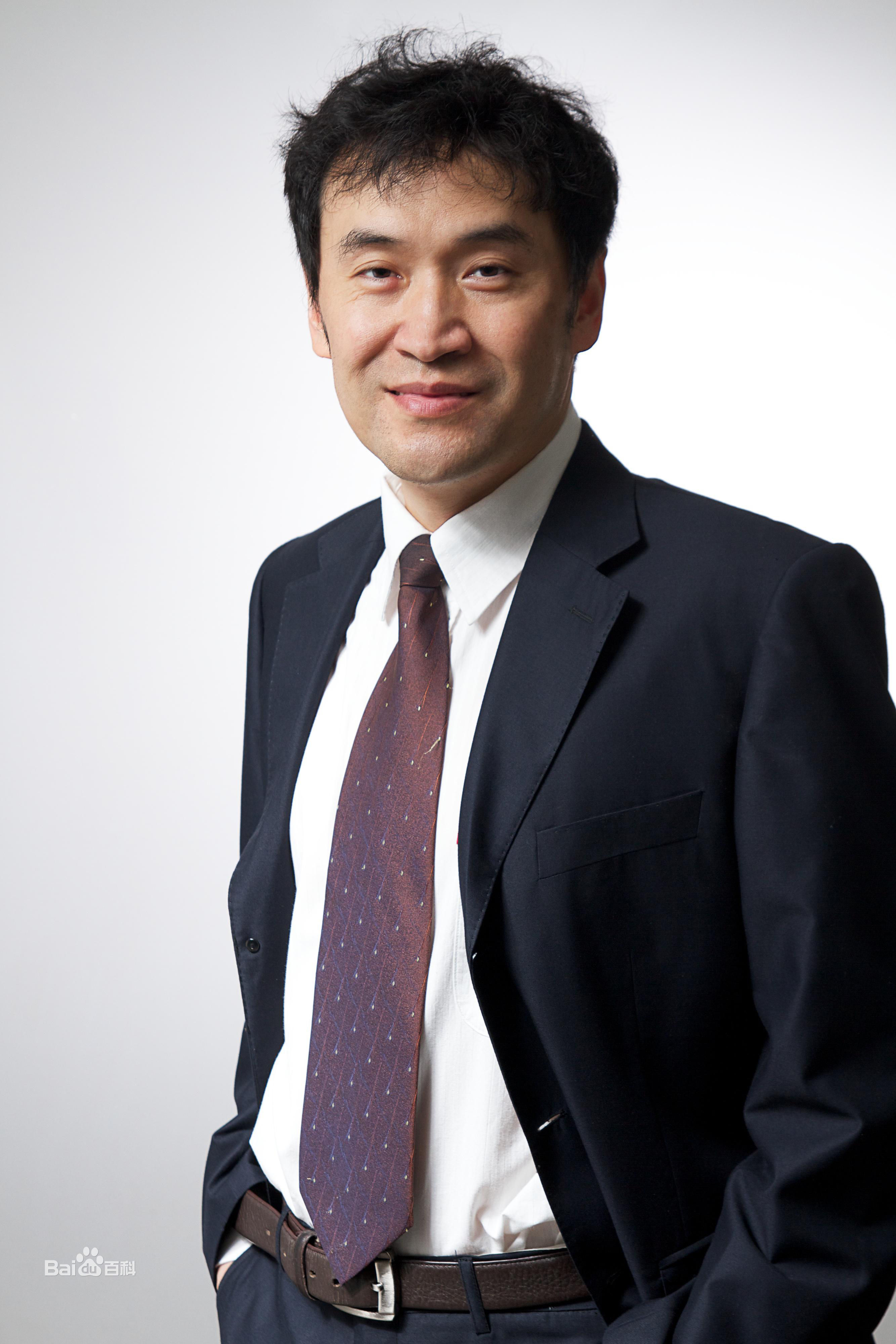
- Education: University of Toronto
- Employers: Luohan Academy; Cheung Kong Graduate School of Business; Washington University in St. Louis

Chen Long (Chinese: 陈龙; pinyin: Chén Lóng) currently serves as the director of Luohan Academy, the think tank of Alibaba. Before this, he was the chief strategy officer of Ant Financial Group since 2014. Chen received his Ph.D. in Finance from University of Toronto, and was a tenured professor at Olin Business School, Washington University in St. Louis. After returning to China in 2010, Chen took the position of the Associate Dean of Cheung Kong Graduate School of Business (CKGSB), Professor of Finance.

== Publications ==
- Corporate Yield Spreads and Bond Liquidity, with David Lesmond and Jason Wei, Journal of Finance, 62 (2007), 119-149;
- The Expected Value Premium, with Ralitsa Petkova and Lu Zhang, Journal of Financial Economics, 87 (2008), 269-280.
- Expected Returns, Yield Spreads, and Asset Pricing Tests, with Murillo Campello and Lu Zhang, Review of Financial Studies, 21(3) (2008), 1297-1338.
- On the Reversal of Dividend and Return Predictability: A Tale of Two Periods, Journal of Financial Economics, 92(1) (2009), 128-151.
- On the Relation between the Credit Spread Puzzle and the Equity Premium Puzzle, with Pierre Collin-Dufresne and Robert Goldstein, Review of Financial Studies, 22(9) (2009), 3367-3409.
- Return Decomposition, with Xinlei Zhao, Review of Financial Studies, 22(12) (2009), 5213-5249.
- Do Time-Varying Risk Premiums Explain Labor Market Performance? With Lu Zhang, forthcoming, Journal of Financial Economics.
- Are Financial Constraints Priced? Evidence from Firm Fundamentals and Stocks, with Murillo Campello, 2009, Journal of Money, Credit and Banking.
- Dividend Smoothing and Predictability, with Zhi Da and Richard Priestley, Management Science, 2012.
- What Drives Stock Price Movements? With Zhi Da and Xinlei Zhao, lead article, Review of Financial Studies, 2012.
- Mechanical Mean Reversion of Leverage Ratios, with Shelly Zhao, Economic Letters, 95 (2007) 223-229.
