= Geoffrey G. Parker =

American economist

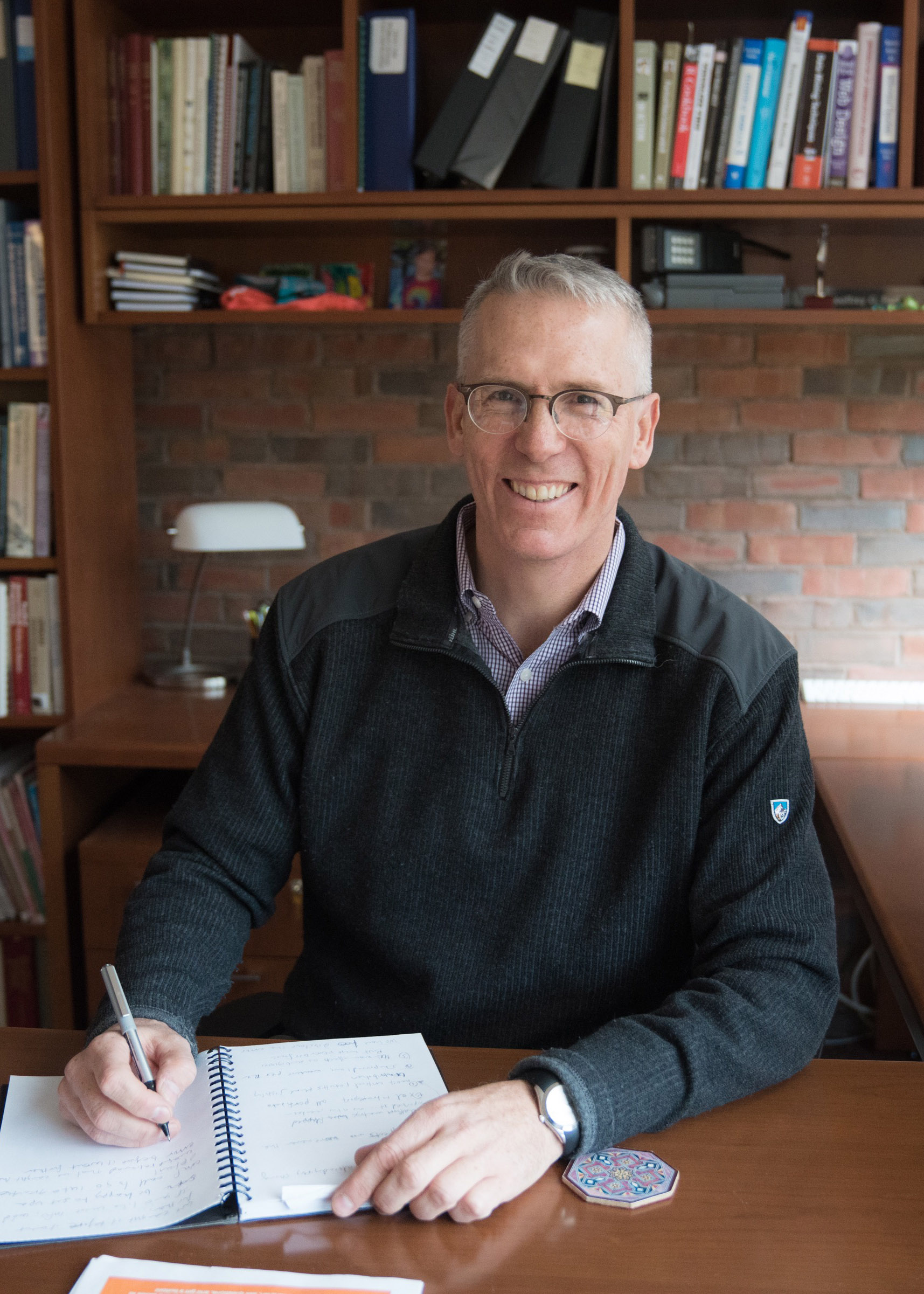
- Born: Dayton, Ohio
- Citizenship: United States of America
- Education: Princeton; MIT
- Known for: Two-sided markets
- Scientific career
- Fields: Management Science; Information Economics
- Workplaces: Dartmouth College; Tulane University; MIT Initiative on the Digital Economy

Geoffrey G. Parker is a scholar specializing in distributed innovation, energy markets, and the economics of information. He co-developed the theories of two-sided network markets and the inverted firm with Marshall Van Alstyne.

Parker's current research explores platform business strategies, data sharing and governance, the role of data and artificial intelligence (AI) in improving industrial energy efficiency, enabling market formation for the decarbonization of energy systems, and advancing healthcare systems.

Parker is the Charles E. Hutchinson '68A Professor of Engineering Innovation at Dartmouth College and the Faculty Director of the Arthur L. Irving Institute for Energy & Society. In this latter role, he oversees the Institute's academic and research appointments, the research program, and academic offerings that include the Master of Energy Transition (MET). Previously, Parker was Director of Dartmouth's Master of Engineering Management (MEM) program, redesigning it to focus on product management, data analysis, and AI.

Parker is also a Research Fellow and Visiting Scholar at the MIT Initiative on the Digital Economy. Parker is co-author of the book Platform Revolution, which was included among the 16 must-read business books for 2016 by Forbes and has since been published in 10 languages. Hal Varian, a former Chief Economist at Google, called Platform Revolution "an authoritative guide to the role of online platforms."

== Early life and education ==
Geoffrey Parker was born in Dayton, Ohio. He received a bachelor of science degree in Electrical Engineering and Computer Science from Princeton University in 1986. He then completed the General Electric Company Financial Management Training Program and held multiple positions in engineering and finance at General Electric in North Carolina and Wisconsin. He obtained a master's degree in Electrical Engineering (Technology and Policy Program) in 1993 and a doctorate in Management Science in 1998, both at the Massachusetts Institute of Technology.

== Career ==
Parker is the Charles E. Hutchinson ‘68A Professor of Engineering Innovation at Dartmouth College. He is also the Faculty Director of the Arthur L. Irving Institute for Energy & Society at Dartmouth, where he reports to the provost and is responsible for all Institute activities. In addition, Parker is a Research Fellow and Visiting Scholar at the MIT Initiative on the Digital Economy, where he leads platform industry research studies and co-chairs the annual MIT Platform Strategy Summit. His teaching includes platform strategy courses that provide managers the tools they need to understand the digital economy and technical courses that give students the skills they need to transform large data sets into actionable knowledge. Parker was formerly Professor of Management Science at Tulane University, where he served as Director of the Tulane Energy Institute. Parker has taught both undergraduate and full-time MBA courses as well as professional MBA and executive MBA programs for Tulane, MIT, and Dartmouth.

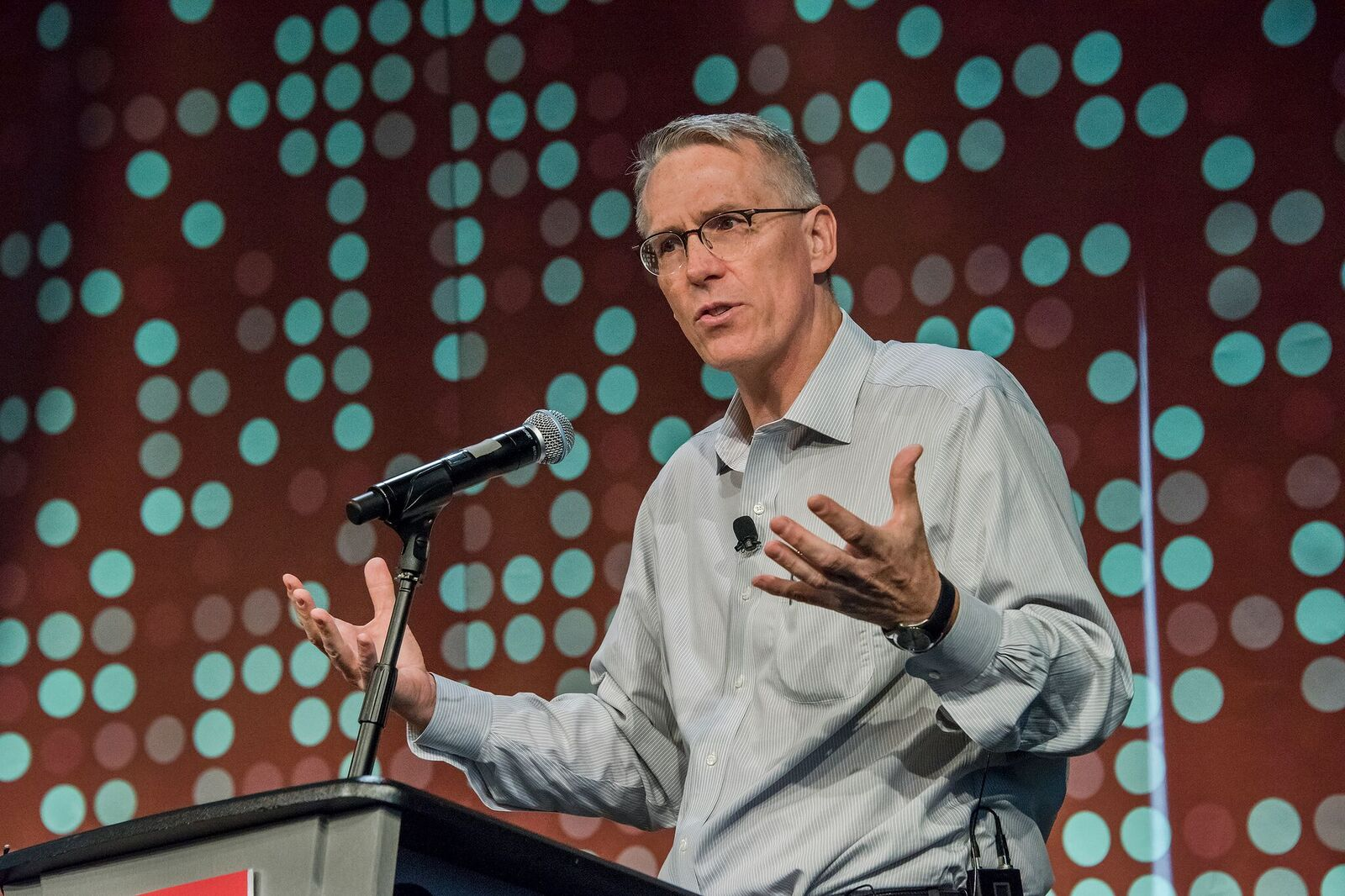
Geoffrey G. Parker lectures.

Parker served as a National Science Foundation panelist from 2009 to 2011, and in 2024. He is a department editor for the journal Production and Operations Management. He previously served as an associate editor for the journal Management Science and was President of the Industry Studies Association. From 2013 to 2015, Parker was a member of the GE Africa Learning Advisory Board. Consisting of academics drawn from across Africa, the United States of America, and the United Kingdom, the board assisted in the development and broadening of technical workforce skills across Africa.

In 2020 Parker was elected a Fellow of the Production & Operations Management Society. That same year, he joined the World Economic Forum’s Global Future Council on Advanced Manufacturing and Production; there, he co-authored two reports, "Winning the Race for Survival" and "Unlocking Business Model Innovation Through Advanced Manufacturing." In 2025 Parker began working with the World Economic Forum’s initiative on Transitioning Industrial Clusters and co-authored a paper for the group, "Five Steps for Digital Collaboration in Industrial Clusters."

Parker is also a Distinguished Fellow at the Luohan Academy, an open research institute based in Hangzhou, China, that was initiated by the Alibaba Group. The Academy’s research community explores the social and economic issues of digital technology.

In 2014 Parker served as chair of the U.S.-Israel Energy Summit.

== Work ==
Parker has made significant contributions to the field of network economics and strategy as co-developer of the theory of two-sided markets and the theory of the inverted firm with Marshall Van Alstyne.

Parker and Van Alstyne observed that two-sided markets, unlike traditional value chains with cost and revenue on different sides, have cost and revenue on both sides, because the “platform” has a distinct group of users on each side. Their approach has been described as the “chicken and egg” problem of how to build a platform. They concluded that the problem must be solved by platform owners, typically by cross-subsidizing between groups or even giving away products or services for free. Two-sided network effects can cause markets to concentrate in the hands of a few firms. These properties inform the strategies and antitrust law approaches at all firms involved in the network.

Parker's research also includes studies of distributed innovation, business platform strategy, and platforms to integrate distributed energy resources.

Parker is also a frequent keynote speaker, and he advises senior leaders on their organizations’ platform strategies. In recent presentations, Parker has spoken before groups that include the India Institute of Science, New York Climate Week, and the Hannover Messe Industrial Conference.

== Publications ==
Parker's research has appeared in journals that include Harvard Business Review, California Management Review, MIT Sloan Management Review, Energy Economics, Industrial and Corporate Change, Information Systems Research, Journal of Economics and Management Strategy, Journal of Management Information Systems, Management Science, MIS Quarterly, Production and Operations Management, Strategic Management Journal, and Management and Business Review.

His work has also been featured on business and news publications, including “MarketWatch,” Wired, and The Wall Street Journal. In 2021 Parker co-authored a paper on the Digital Markets Act for the European Union. Another article he co-wrote, “Pipelines, Platforms, and the New Rules of Strategy,” was cited in Harvard Business Review’s 2025 “Definitive HBR Strategy Glossary” under the category of Platform Strategy.

Parker is co-author of a book, Platform Revolution: How Networked Markets Are Transforming the Economy and How to Make Them Work for You. This book describes the information technologies, standards, and rules that make up platforms, and also explains how they are used and developed by the biggest and most innovative global companies. Forbes included Platform Revolution on its list of 16 must-read business books for 2016, describing it as "a practical guide to the new business model that is transforming the way we work and live." Parker and his co-authors are currently working on a successor book, Platform Domination, scheduled for publication in 2026.

Parker also co-wrote Operations Management For Dummies within the For Dummies franchise.

An updated list of Parker's publications is available via Google Scholar.

== Awards ==
Parker won the Wick Skinner Early Career Research Accomplishments Award in 2003. He was given the Dean's Excellence in Teaching Award for Graduate Education at Freeman School of Business in 2014.

In 2019, 2021, and 2023 Parker was named to the Thinkers50 ranking. In 2021 Parker won an ISS Practical Impacts Award, which recognizes outstanding leadership and sustained impact on the information systems industry. In 2022 Parker and two co-authors received an Antitrust Writing Award for their paper on platform mergers and antitrust. And in 2025, a Harvard Business Review article Parker co-authored, “Pipelines, Platforms, and the New Rules of Strategy,” was included in “The Definitive HBR Strategy Glossary.”
