= Storemates =

Online service

- Founded: 2011; 14 years ago
- Founders: Shaffique Prabatani; Ben Rogers; Jason Bryan
- Website: storemates.co.uk

Storemates is a two-sided market for users to find available storage spaces. It was founded by Shaffique Prabatani, Ben Rogers and Jason Bryan in 2011.

Users who want to list available storage space can make a posting on the Storemates website with a location, size guide and weekly renting price. Users looking to store items can search for available listings in their desired location.

== History ==
Shaffique Prabatani developed the concept for the website after a personal experience looking for storage space. Prabatani designed a flyer asking neighbours if they had any spare room in their houses, offering to pay a few pounds a month in return for some storage space. He posted the fliers through the letterboxes and within a week he had received 15 phone calls from friendly neighbours offering him space for his stuff in their lofts, garages and spare rooms. Prabatani, along with Ben Rogers and Jason Bryan, created an online service where people can share their space. The website appeared on BBC's Dragon's Den and BBC's Real Storage Wars.
