= Marshall Van Alstyne =

American information economist

Marshall W. Van Alstyne
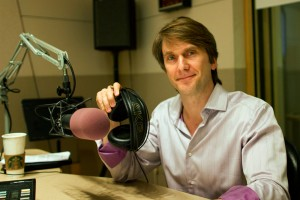
- Van Alstyne in 2011
- Born: March 28, 1962 (63)
- Citizenship: American
- Education: Yale; MIT
- Known for: Two-sided markets Platform economics Cyberbalkanization; Business-to-business platforms
- Scientific career
- Fields: Information Systems; Industrial Organization; Information Economics; Law and Economics
- Workplaces: Boston University; MIT Sloan School of Management
- Notable students: Sinan Aral

Marshall W. Van Alstyne (born March 28, 1962)is an American academic and researcher whose work focuses on the economics of information, digital platforms, and market design. He is a professor of information systems at Boston University and has held affiliated research appointments at Harvard Law School, MIT Sloan School of Management, and Stanford University. His work focuses on the economics of information. This includes a sustained interest in information markets and in how information and technology affect productivity with an emphasis on “platforms” as an extension of the work on two-sided markets.

== Early life and education ==
Marshall Van Alstyne was born in Columbus, Ohio. He received a B.A. in Computer Science from Yale University in 1984. He then worked as a software systems developer at Martin Marietta Data Systems in Colorado and later as associate staff at MIT Lincoln Laboratory in Massachusetts, before undertaking graduate study. He obtained his M.S in management in 1991 and Ph.D. in Information Systems and Economics in 1998, both at the MIT Sloan School of Management.

Van Alstyne completed his doctoral studies under the supervision of Erik Brynjolfsson.

== Career ==
Van Alstyne has held academic appointments in information systems, economics, and digital policy across several major research universities.

He joined Boston University in 2004, where he was appointed Assistant Professor, promoted to Associate Professor in 2008, and to Full Professor in 2015. He has also held the Allen & Kelli Questrom Professorship in Information Systems since 2018 and served as Chair of the Information Systems Department from 2015 to 2020. At Boston University, his research has focused on network economics, digital platforms, intellectual property and data rights, misinformation, and antitrust, and he has taught courses in information economics, platforms, and strategy in both the in-person and the online MBA programs. He also co-founded and led the school’s Platform Symposium beginning in 2012.

In addition to his primary appointment, Van Alstyne has held multiple affiliated research roles. Since 2024, he has been a Faculty Associate and Visiting Scholar at Harvard Law School, with research sponsored by the Berkman Klein Center for Internet & Society. His work there focuses on free speech, misinformation, social media governance, Section 230, and legal reform.

He has also served as a Digital Fellow at Stanford University since 2020, with research sponsored by the Stanford Digital Economy Lab, where his work addresses platforms, information economics, data rights, misinformation, antitrust, and artificial intelligence governance.

Since 2004, Van Alstyne has been a Digital Fellow at MIT Sloan School of Management, with research supported by the MIT Initiative on the Digital Economy. His research there has emphasized platform strategy, information economics, information technology productivity, social networks, and competitive strategy.

Earlier in his career, Van Alstyne served as Assistant Professor at the University of Michigan from 1998 to 2004. His research during this period examined communication markets, electronic spam, social networks, and information technology productivity, and he developed courses in statistics, information economics, electronic commerce, cognitive psychology, and computer modeling.

He also held summer Visiting Scholar appointments at Harvard Business School in 2000 and 2001, where his research focused on communications, social networks, and information technology productivity.

Earlier teaching experience includes an adjunct faculty appointment at the University of Denver in 1985, where he developed a graduate course in artificial intelligence and natural language processing.

He is recognized among the top 2% of scientists worldwide for research impact, according to citation analyses conducted by Stanford University and Elsevier.

Alongside his academic career, Van Alstyne has served on advisory boards for technology and platform-oriented firms. He is a member of the Board of Advisers of Wisdomise, Inc. (since 2022), advising on business models, monetization, and platform strategy. He has also served on the Board of Advisers of Apigee, Inc. until Google acquired it for $625 million.

== Work and research ==
Van Alstyne’s research focuses on the economics of information, digital platforms, and the design of information-based markets.

His work examines how the distinctive properties of information such as low marginal cost of reproduction, network effects, and rapid dissemination affect productivity, market structure, competition, and social welfare.

One line of research examines the relationship between information abundance and social fragmentation. In his doctoral research, published in 1996 as “Electronic Communities: Global Village or Cyberbalkans,” Van Alstyne analyzed how the expanding availability of online information could produce what he termed cyberbalkanization. The theory argues that an oversupply of information encourages individuals to focus selectively on preferred sources and viewpoints, a process facilitated by digital technologies that allow users to filter and personalize content. This dynamic can lead to the formation of non-overlapping information spheres or “filter bubbles,” in which communities consume largely homogeneous information.

After his early work on cyberbalkanization, Van Alstyne also made an important contribution to research on social networks and information flows by identifying the conditions under which either strong ties or network diversity produce greater access to novel information. In collaboration with Sinan Aral, he developed the “diversity-bandwidth tradeoff,” showing that while structurally diverse networks can provide access to non-redundant information, strong ties often transmit more total novelty because they carry greater communication bandwidth and richer information flows. Their research demonstrated that strong, high-bandwidth ties can, under many conditions, outperform weak ties in delivering useful new knowledge over time, revising the conventional interpretation of Granovetter’s “strength of weak ties.”

Another major contribution of his work concerns two-sided networks and multi-sided platforms, which analyze markets in which a platform facilitates interactions between distinct groups of users. In early research presented in an ACM conference in 2000, Van Alstyne examined the economic mechanisms through which digital platforms coordinate participation and value exchange among different sides of a market. This research helped establish analytical foundations for the study of platform-based markets, a field later developed extensively with collaborators including Geoffrey G. Parker and Sangeet Paul Choudary. Their work analyzes how network effects, pricing strategies, and governance rules shape the growth and competitive dynamics of digital platforms.

Building on this work, Van Alstyne and Parker also explored the concept of platforms as “inverted firms.” In contrast to traditional firms that scale production internally through employees and owned resources, platform firms often generate value by enabling external participants—such as developers, producers, or users—to create complementary goods and services.

More broadly, his work integrates economic theory, econometrics, and network analysis to evaluate how information flows influence organizational productivity, communication markets, and the design of information goods. A recurring theme in his research is the development of incentive mechanisms and market structures that address digital externalities—such as unsolicited electronic communications and information pollution—by aligning participant incentives with efficient information exchange.

Van Alstyne is also the co-author of Platform Revolution: How Networked Markets Are Transforming the Economy and How to Make Them Work for You, which examines the economic logic and organizational structures underlying digital platform businesses.

Forbes included it among 16 must-read business books for 2016, describing it as "a practical guide to the new business model that is transforming the way we work and live."

== Personal life ==
Van Alstyne is the son of the constitutional law scholar William Van Alstyne.

According to his father’s obituary in The New York Times, Marshall Van Alstyne’s given name reflects a family tradition of naming children after U.S. Supreme Court justices: he was named after former Chief Justice John Marshall. The same obituary notes that his half-sister, Harlan Van Cao, was named after Justice John Marshall Harlan.

He has discussed aspects of his personal history, including anecdotal events involving his interactions with well-known figures; for example, an account circulating in some online repositories states that on September 7, 2010, he used the Heimlich maneuver to assist the gospel singer Ron Kenoly when the latter was choking in a hotel in Washington, D.C.

== Awards ==
- William L. Stewart Award from MIT (1990) an honor recognizing outstanding contributions to student life and leadership within the Institute. The award was associated with his involvement in early student entrepreneurship initiatives, including participation in the formative of the MIT student business plan competition, which at the time operated as the MIT $10K Competition and later expanded into the MIT $100K Entrepreneurship Competition
- MIT Hugh Hampton Young fellowship for interdisciplinary research (1994).
- National Science Foundation Faculty Career Award (1999)
- 2006 Best paper at the International Conference on Information Systems with Sinan Aral and Erik Brynjolfsson
- 2016 – Golden Book Award, Best Business Book: Platform Revolution (Mandarin edition)
- 2017 – Distinguished Scholar Award, Academy of Management, OCIS Division
- 2018 – AIS Best Publication of the Year Award, for best article across multiple journals
- 2018 – Paper of the Year, MIS Quarterly, for best paper published in 2017
- Thinkers 50 Digital Thinking Award (2019) – Ranked #36 among management scholars globally
- INFORMS Practical Impact Award (2020) – For research with real world impact
- Thinkers 50 (2021) – Award shared with Geoff Parker
- 2022 – Herbert Simon Award, Rajk College, for outstanding solutions to real business problems (democratically voted by students 2021)
- 2023 – Thinkers50: Ranked among top 50 management scholars worldwide
- 2023 – Best Paper, runner-up, INFORMS Technology Innovation Management & Entrepreneurship (TIME) award, for most influential research of the past 5 years Best Paper, runner-up, INFORMS Technology Innovation Management & Entrepreneurship (TIME) award, for most influential research of the past 5 years
