= Sangeet Paul Choudary =

Business scholar, entrepreneur, advisor and author

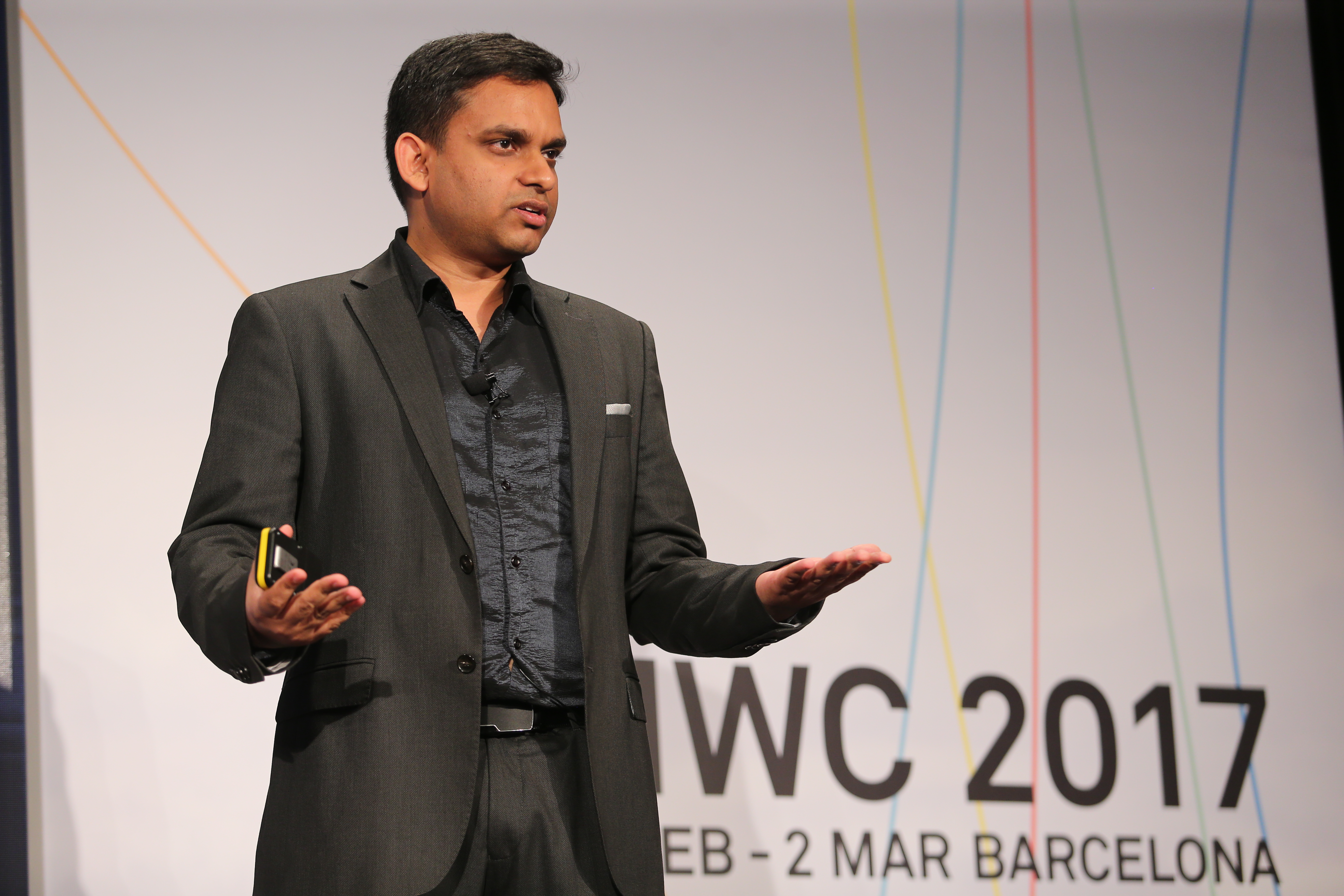
- Choudary addressing the Mobile World Congress 2017
- Education: IIT-Kanpur; IIM-Bangalore; Harvard Kennedy School
- Occupations: Entrepreneur; Author
- Known for: Author of Platform Revolution, CEO of Platformation Labs, WEF Young Global Leader
- Notable work: Platform Scale; Platform Revolution
- Website: platformthinkinglabs.com

Sangeet Paul Choudary is a business executive, advisor, and best-selling author. He is best known for his work on platform economics and network effects. He is the co-author of the international best-selling book Platform Revolution: How Networked Markets Are Transforming the Economy and How to Make Them Work for You.

Choudary's work on platform economics has been featured on four occasions among Harvard Business Review's top 10 management ideas. It is ranked among HBR's top 10 strategy publications, alongside the works of Michael Porter, Clayton Christensen, A.G. Lafley, and others.

For his contributions to the field of platform economics, Choudary was named a Young Global Leader by the World Economic Forum in 2017.

== Career ==
=== Board appointments ===
Choudary is appointed as an expert member on several Forbes Global 2000 boards and committees, including the ING Bank's Global Innovation Council, Standard Bank's Global Business Board, and the board of directors of Grupo Pao De Acucar, the largest food retailer in Latin America. He has also served on the World Economic Forum's Global Future Council on Platforms and Systems.

In the public and non-profit sector, Choudary is appointed to the board of directors of the ASEAN Financial Innovation Network, backed by the World Bank and the Government of Singapore. He is also appointed to the Innovation Advisory Council of UNLEASH, a global impact foundation backed by the Carlsberg Group. He also serves on the four-member national advisory committee to the Ministry of Housing and Urban Affairs by the Government of India, to implement a digital public goods strategy for urban innovation in India.

=== Keynote speaking ===
Choudary has addressed various UN bodies, including the World Intellectual Property Organization (WIPO) and the International Labor Organization (ILO).

Choudary has also addressed the Australian Financial Review Summit, where he was one of four keynotes alongside two heads of state and the chairman of the IMF.

Choudary addressed the G20 summit in Brisbane in November 2014 and is a frequent speaker at the events of the World Economic Forum.

Choudary frequently addresses the board meetings of Fortune 500 firms, like ANZ Bank. He has also been retained as an industry thought leader by technology brands including Microsoft, Huawei and AT&T. According to AAE Speakers, Choudary's speaking fee ranges between $50,000 – $100,000 for global events.

=== Writing and thought leadership ===
Choudary is the author of several best-selling books, including Platform Revolution: How Networked Markets Are Transforming the Economy and How to Make Them Work for You. Platform Revolution was ranked a top 10 international best-seller by 800CEOREAD and a must-read business book for 2016 by Forbes. In 2015, Choudary wrote the book Platform Scale: How an emerging business model helps startups build large empires with minimum investment.

In 2021, Choudary's new release Platform Scale for a Post-Pandemic World was featured as one of Penguin RandomHouse India's top seven books for the year, alongside books by Bill Gates, Kazuo Ishiguro, and Haruki Murakami.

In 2025, Choudary published Reshuffle, explaining how AI transforms the future of work and competition in the knowledge economy. Inc Magazine hailed Reshuffle as a book that "will change how you think about AI" while the Financial Times referred to Choudary's frameworks as "a useful way to see the bigger picture."

Choudary co-authored the article "Pipelines, Platforms, and the New Rules of Strategy" in the April 2016 edition of the Harvard Business Review. This article was subsequently selected as one of the top 10 management ideas for the year 2017. In 2019, it was included in the HBR Top 10 Reads on Business Model Innovation. In 2020, it was selected as one of the top 10 articles on strategy ever published in the Harvard Business Review.

Choudary's writing has been published in the Harvard Business Review, the MIT Sloan Management Review, the MIT Technology Review, the Rotman Management Magazine, the European Business Review, and INSEAD Knowledge.

=== Academia and research ===
Choudary is a Senior Fellow in Competition Policy at the Tusher Strategic Initiative on Technology Leadership at the University of California, Berkeley. Choudary is also appointed as a Non-Resident Scholar at Dartmouth College, for his research on programmable energy ecosystems.

Choudary has previously served as an Entrepreneur-in-Residence at the INSEAD Business School and the co-chair of the MIT Platform Strategy Summit at the MIT Media Lab. He was formerly a research fellow at the Centre for Global Enterprise, a New York – based think tank. In 2017, Choudary was also selected as one of the 50 thinkers included in the compilation Dear CEO by Thinkers50.

Choudary has also served as a technology policy researcher at the Brookings Institution and the International Labor Organization. Choudary has been a sought after expert for research outlets including the International Labor Organization, the MIT Technology Review, the World Economic Forum, the Economist, McKinsey & Company, and the European Parliament.

=== Education ===
Choudary is an alumnus of the Indian Institute of Technology (IIT) Kanpur, the Indian Institute of Management (IIM) Bangalore, and the Harvard Kennedy School of Government. At the 2016 annual convocation at his alma mater, IIM Bangalore, Choudary received special mention during the convocation speech by chief guest Nandan Nilekani, for his work on platform models.

In 2020, Choudary received the Distinguished Alumnus Award at the Indian Institute of Management (IIM) Bangalore. According to the Bangalore Mirror, he is the youngest ever recipient of the award. Choudary received the award in recognition for his contribution to Industry and Thought Leadership.

== Honors and awards ==
=== Harvard Business Review ===
- 2020: Selected as one of the top 10 strategy publications ever published in the Harvard Business Review, alongside Michael Porter, Clayton Christensen, and others.
- 2020: Selected as one of the top 10 publications on the topic of platform and ecosystems in the Harvard Business Review.
- 2019: Selected as one of the top 10 publications on business model innovation ever published in the Harvard Business Review.
- 2017: Selected among the top 10 management ideas for the year by Harvard Business Review.

=== World Economic Forum ===
- 2017: Selected as a Young Global Leader by the World Economic Forum.
- 2016: Appointed to the World Economic Forum's Global Future Council on Platforms and Systems.

=== Thinkers50 ===
- 2025: Winner of the Award for Distinguished Achievement in Strategy.
- 2021: Shortlisted for the Award for Distinguished Achievement in Strategy.
- 2016: Ranked among the top 30 management thinkers globally most likely to shape the future of how organizations are managed and led, by Thinkers50 Radar.
- 2015: Ranked among the top 50 business thinkers of Indian origin, by Thinkers50.

=== Other accolades ===
- 2020: Recipient of the Distinguished Alumnus Award, Indian Institute of Management.
- 2021: Featured on Tatler's GenT List.
- 2026: Ranked among the top 25 management consultants globally, Industry Leaders.

== Ideas and theories ==
Choudary is best known for his work on the transition of business models from pipelines to platforms. He first proposed this idea in a 2013 article for Wired magazine. The idea, gained widespread adoption after his 2016 article on this topic was selected by Harvard Business Review among its top 10 ideas of the year. Choudary is also credited with proposing the idea of the core interaction as the central focus of value creation on platform business models, presented in his books Platform Scale and Platform Revolution. Choudary's work on the transformation of incumbent businesses to platform business models has been widely quoted in media. His recent work explains the importance of platform economics in manufacturing, heavy industry, healthcare, and financial services. Choudary credits game design theory as one of the inspirations for his work on platform design.

Choudary's work with the International Labor Organization and the World Intellectual Property Organization also highlights the conflicts between platforms and their ecosystem participants. In a 2023 Financial Times feature profiling his ideas, Choudary stresses on the ideas of 'control points' to manage platform relationships with the ecosystem.

For his work on platform economics, Choudary has been hailed as a 'global thought leader on the platform business model' by Forbes, a 'top global thinker' by the Huffington Post and a 'leading expert on the so-called platform economy' by the United Nations' WIPO. Choudary has also been featured twice in the Thinkers50 lists for his ideas and theories and has been featured on the Gen T List by Tatler, a British high-society and fashion magazine, for his work on "preparing global industries for an uncertain future".

== Impact on public policy ==
Choudary has worked with several governments and policy makers in Europe to help them develop competitive and regulatory responses to global platforms entering Europe. Choudary's work champions the use of digital public goods for societal and national development.

Choudary has been a prominent advocate of individual rights in the platform economy and has worked extensively with several international bodies, including the United Nations, on this topic. His research on worker exploitation by labor platforms was released by the International Labor Organization as part of their Future of Work Research Paper Series. In November 2017, Choudary addressed a high-level seminar by the Permanent Mission of Belgium in Geneva, highlighting the factors that lead to exploitation of workers on digital platforms.

In February 2018, Choudary addressed the Parliament of Denmark on labor policy for the platform economy, stressing on the need for a new data-driven regulation paradigm for platforms. His recommendations for regulating platforms through open data sharing were instrumental in informing the Danish government's decision to implement open data regulation for Airbnb in May 2018. In September 2018, Choudary's framework also informed the set up of the world's first collective agreement between a platform company and a trade union, again in Denmark.

Choudary's research on the adverse impact of platforms on the creative economy was featured as a keynote at the annual global conference of the World Intellectual Property Organization (WIPO). His recommendations advocated the role of the WIPO as a standards setting organization in a platform economy, for protection of creator interests.

Choudary's research also looks at readiness of countries moving into the platform economy. In partnership with Standard Bank, Choudary has also co-authored a paper on the rise of the platform economy in the African continent.

Choudary's work on digital trade includes a future positioning paper for countries like Singapore that is widely considered a blueprint for Singapore's strategy for digital trade. The paper suggests that countries can adopt a platform strategy and establish free data ports to harness digital trade flows.

In November 2020, in the aftermath of the 2020 US elections, Choudary's research on China's strategy for technology export and dominance was published through the Brookings Institution, a leading American think-tank, to inform the incoming Biden Administration on possible policy responses.

== Publications ==
=== Books ===
- Platform Revolution (2016, with Geoffrey G. Parker and Marshall van Alstyne), W. W. Norton & Company
- Platform Scale: How an emerging business model helps startups build large empires with minimum investment (2015)
- Platform Scale for a Post-Pandemic World (2020 – New Edition), Penguin Random House
- Reshuffle - Who wins when AI restacks the knowledge economy (2025)

=== HBR's 10 Must Reads Compilations ===
- HBR's 10 Must Reads on Strategy Vol. 2 (2020, Harvard Business Review)
- HBR's 10 Must Reads on Business Model Innovation (2019, Harvard Business Review)
- HBR's 10 Must Reads 2017: The Definitive Management Ideas of the Year from Harvard Business Review (2016, Harvard Business Review)
- HBR's 10 Must Reads on Platforms and Ecosystems (2020, Harvard Business Review)

=== Other compilations ===
- The Fast Future Blur (2024, Wiley)
- Transforming beyond the crisis (2020, Brightline Initiative)
- ILO's Future of Work Research Paper Series (2018, as resident researcher, International Labor Organization)
- The Chief Strategy Officer Playbook (2018, Brightline Initiative)
- Dear CEO: 50 Personal Letters from the World's Leading Business Thinkers (2017, Bloomsbury Publishing)
- Managing Startups: Best Blog Posts (2013, O'Reilly Media)

=== Selected papers ===
- Pipelines, Platforms, and the New Rules of Strategy (with Geoffrey G. Parker and Marshall van Alstyne, April 2016), Harvard Business Review
- China's country-as-platform strategy for global influence, Brookings Institution
- The architecture of digital labour platforms: Policy recommendations on platform design for worker well-being, International Labor Organization (ILO)
- Freelancers on the network, MIT Technology Review
- Why business models fail: Pipes vs Platforms, Wired Magazine
