= Steven Weber (professor) =

Steven Weber is a retired professor who taught at the School of Information and the Department of Political Science at the University of California, Berkeley. He was also the Director of the Center for Long Term Cybersecurity (CLTC), a Berkeley think tank, for nine years. After studying history and international development at Washington University in St. Louis, he received an M.D. and a Ph.D in political science from Stanford University.

He is the author of several books about international politics and economics. He is also the editor of Globalization and the European Political Economy (Columbia University Press, 2000). Perhaps his most well-known book is The Success of Open Source, on the economy and motivations behind open source and free software. There he proposes the concept of anti-rival goods.

== Books ==
- Cooperation and Discord in U.S.—Soviet Arms Control (Princeton Press, 1991)
- The Success of Open Source (Harvard University Press, 2004) ISBN 0-674-01858-3
