= Reed's law =

Increase in utility with network size

Reed's law is the assertion of David P. Reed that the utility of large networks, particularly social networks, can scale exponentially with the size of the network.

The reason for this is that the number of possible sub-groups of network participants is 2^{N} − N − 1, where N is the number of participants. This grows much more rapidly than either

- the number of participants, N, or
- the number of possible pair connections, N(N − 1)/2 (which follows Metcalfe's law).

so that even if the utility of groups available to be joined is very small on a per-group basis, eventually the network effect of potential group membership can dominate the overall economics of the system.

== Derivation ==
Given a set A of N people, it has 2^{N} possible subsets. This is not difficult to see, since we can form each possible subset by simply choosing for each element of A one of two possibilities: whether to include that element, or not.

However, this includes the (one) empty set, and N singletons, which are not properly subgroups. So 2^{N} − N − 1 subsets remain, which is exponential, like 2^{N}.

== Quote ==
From David P. Reed's, "The Law of the Pack" (Harvard Business Review, February 2001, pp 23–4):

"[E]ven Metcalfe's law understates the value created by a group-forming network [GFN] as it grows. Let's say you have a GFN with n members. If you add up all the potential two-person groups, three-person groups, and so on that those members could form, the number of possible groups equals 2^{n}. So the value of a GFN increases exponentially, in proportion to 2^{n}. I call that Reed's Law. And its implications are profound."

== Business implications ==
Reed's Law is often mentioned when explaining competitive dynamics of internet platforms. As the law states that a network becomes more valuable when people can easily form subgroups to collaborate, while this value increases exponentially with the number of connections, business platform that reaches a sufficient number of members can generate network effects that dominate the overall economics of the system.

== Criticism ==
Other analysts of network value functions, including Andrew Odlyzko, have argued that both Reed's Law and Metcalfe's Law overstate network value because they fail to account for the restrictive impact of human cognitive limits on network formation. According to this argument, the research around Dunbar's number implies a limit on the number of inbound and outbound connections a human in a group-forming network can manage, so that the actual maximum-value structure is much sparser than the set-of-subsets measured by Reed's law or the complete graph measured by Metcalfe's law.

== See also ==
- Andrew Odlyzko's "Content is Not King"
- Beckstrom's law
- Coase's penguin
- List of eponymous laws
- Metcalfe's law
- Six Degrees of Kevin Bacon
- Sarnoff's law
- Social capital
