= Phil Reitinger =

American politician

Phil Reitinger was the Deputy Under Secretary of the National Protection and Programs Directorate (NPPD) and Director of the National Cybersecurity Center (NCSC) at the United States Department of Homeland Security from 2009 to 2011. During that time, Reitinger led the department's integrated efforts to reduce risks across physical and cyber infrastructures and helping secure federal networks and systems by collecting, analyzing, integrating and sharing information among interagency partners.

Prior to his nomination, Reitinger was an executive with Microsoft with the title of Chief Trustworthy Infrastructure Strategist, or CTIS. Prior to joining Microsoft, Reitinger was the Executive Director for the Department of Defense Cyber Crime Center.

Upon his departure from DHS in September 2011, Reitinger joined Sony as its Senior Vice President and Chief Information Security Officer. He then went on to become the President of VisionSpear, LLC, an information security and privacy company focused on data-driven decisions and the technology to support them.

In 2013, Reitinger was appointed to Governor Andrew Cuomo's Cyber Security Advisory Board to provide advice on developments in cyber security and make recommendations for protecting New York's critical infrastructure and information systems. He is also a member of the American Bar Association Standing Committee on Law and the National Security Advisory Committee.

In December 2015, Reitinger was appointed as the president and CEO of the Global Cyber Alliance, a transnational, not-for-profit organization dedicated to confronting cyber risk, bringing criminals to justice, and improving the connected world. He also serves on the advisory boards of several companies, and mentors other cyber security and privacy start-ups as a Stars Mentor for the MACH37 seed accelerator. He is also Senior Associate (Non-resident) in, the Strategic Technologies Program, at the Center for Strategic and International Studies.
