= Anti-rival good =

Economic good that has more total value when shared

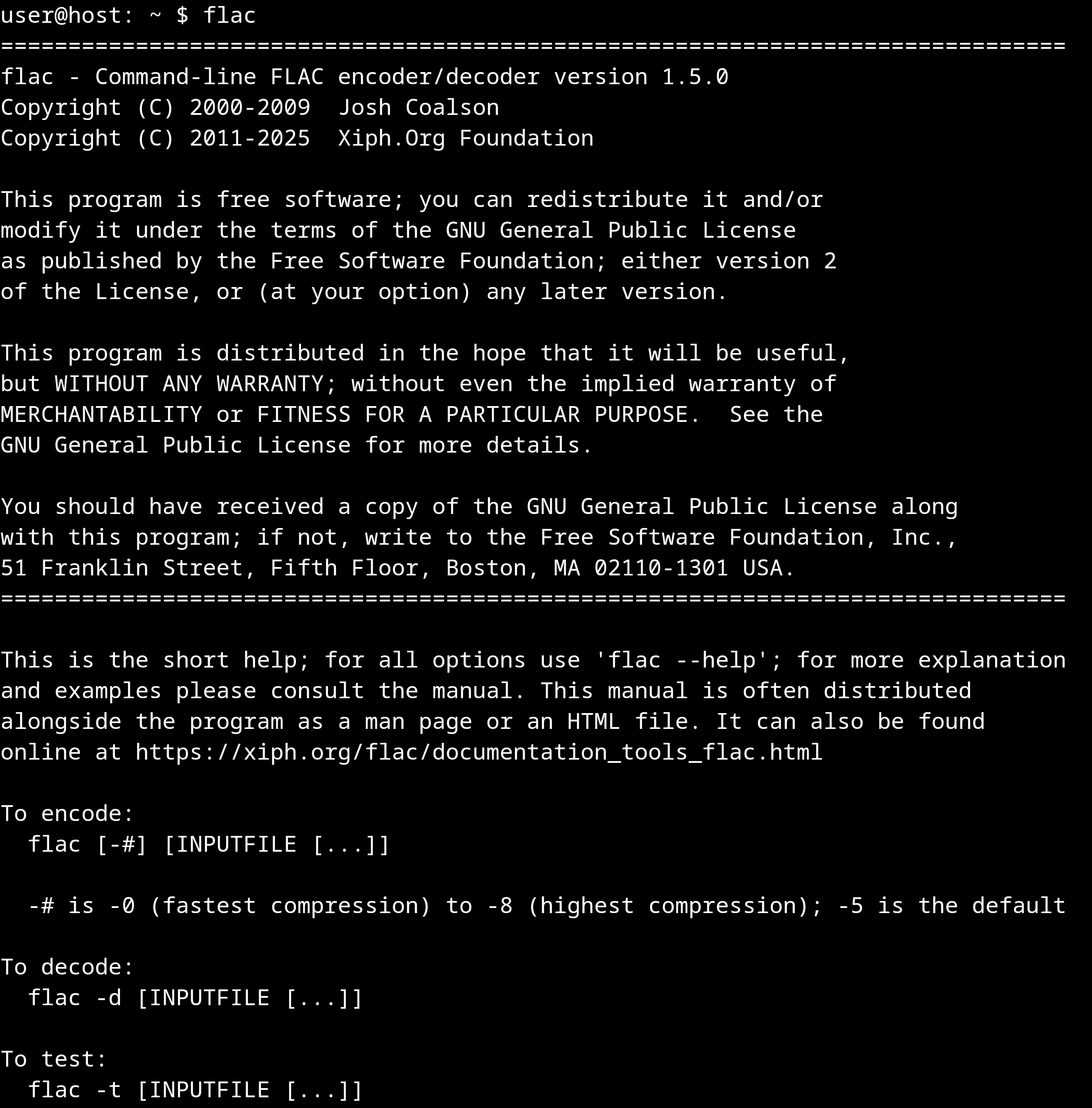
Documentation for FLAC audio encoder software, making it clear that it can be freely distributed "in the hope that it will be useful"

An anti-rival good is one where the more people share it, the more utility each person receives. It is the opposite of a rival good. Examples include software and other information goods created through the process of commons-based peer production. The term was coined by economist Steven Weber.

An anti-rival good meets the test of a public good because it is non-excludable (freely available to all) and non-rival (consumption by one person does not reduce the amount available for others). However, it has the additional quality of being created by private individuals for common benefit without being motivated by pure altruism, because the individual contributor also receives benefits from the contributions of others.

== Free open-source software ==
Lawrence Lessig described free and open-source software as anti-rivalrous: "It's not just that code is non-rival; it's that code in particular, and (at least some) knowledge in general, is, as Weber calls it, 'anti-rival'. I am not only not harmed when you share an anti-rival good: I benefit."

== Network effects ==
The production of anti-rival goods typically benefits from network effects. Leung (2006) quotes from Weber (2004), "Under conditions of anti-rivalness, as the size of the Internet-connected group increases, and there is a heterogeneous distribution of motivations with people who have a high level of interest and some resources to invest, then the large group is more likely, all things being equal, to provide the good than is a small group."

Although this term is a neologism, this category of goods may be neither new nor specific to the Internet era. According to Lessig, English also meets the criteria, as any natural language is an anti-rival good. The term also invokes reciprocity and the concept of a gift economy.

== Data sets ==
Nikander et al. insist that some data sets are anti-rivalrous. This claim rests on three observations:

1. It's cheaper to share than exchange data, because exchange requires erasing in addition to transferring data.
2. If the cost of copying is negligible, then the Pareto optimal allocation of any such data set is (near) universal availability.
3. The value of many data sets increases with the number of users, because the shared knowledge tends to reduce the barriers to understanding and collaboration. This contrasts sharply with material goods, where consumption by one reduces and may eliminate the value to another.

Of course, this assumes that the data shared does not involve uses that would likely harm humans.

== See also ==
- Metcalfe's law
- Network effect
- Rivalry (economics)
