= William Van Alstyne =

American attorney and law scholar (1934–2019)

- Born: William Warner Van Alstyne; February 8, 1934; Chico, California, U.S.
- Died: January 29, 2019 (aged 84); Huntington Beach, California, U.S.
- Education: University of Southern California; Stanford University
- Occupation: Professor
- Known for: Constitutional Law; Civil Rights
- Spouses: Carol Frances (m. 1955; div. 1978) Pamela Gann (m. 1981; div. 2002) Lan Cao (m. 2003)
- Children: Marshall Van Alstyne; Allyn Van Alstyne; Lisa Van Alstyne; Harlan Van Cao

William Warner Van Alstyne (February 8, 1934 – January 29, 2019) was an American attorney, law professor, and constitutional law scholar. Prior to retiring in 2012, he held the named position of Lee Professor of Law at William and Mary Law School. He was the Perkins Professor of Law at Duke Law School for more than 30 years. Among many others, he taught at Chicago Law School, Stanford Law School, University of California, Berkeley Law School, University of California, Los Angeles Law School, and Michigan Law School.

== Early life and education ==
Van Alstyne was born in Chico, California to Richard and Margaret (Ware) Van Alstyne. His father was a college professor and historian and his mother was a writer of children's literature.

Van Alstyne received his Bachelor of Arts in philosophy magna cum laude from the University of Southern California. He received his Juris Doctor from Stanford Law School. Following his admission to the California Bar and brief service as deputy attorney general of California, he joined the Civil Rights Division of the United States Department of Justice, handling voting rights cases in the South. For many years, he was active in the American Association of University of Professors (AAUP).

== Career ==
Following active duty with the United States Air Force, he was appointed to the law faculty of the Ohio State University, advancing to full professor in three years. Van Alstyne was named to Duke's William R. and Thomas S. Perkins Chair of Law in 1974. He held a certificate from The Hague Academy of International Law and has been honored with LL.D. degrees by Wake Forest University and the College of William and Mary.

In 1982, Van Alstyne came out against a proposed constitutional amendment that would allow for voluntary school prayer, saying it would "install the first seeds of theocracy into our government institutions."

In 1987, Van Alstyne was selected in a poll by the New York Law Journal of federal judges, attorneys, and academics, as one of three academics among "the ten most qualified" persons in the country for appointment to the supreme court, a distinction repeated in a similar poll by The American Lawyer, in 1991. Past national president of the American Association of University Professors and former member of the national board of directors of the American Civil Liberties Union, he was elected into the American Academy of Arts and Sciences in 1994.

== Publications ==
Van Alstyne's body of work included many books, law journal articles, and congressional committee testimony. In 1994, he was elected into the American Academy of Arts and Sciences. An article in the January 2000 Journal of Legal Studies found that Van Alstyne was among the top 40 legal scholars in the United States in number of academic citations. His work also had been cited by courts, including the Supreme Court of the United States. In a 2012 study published by the University of Michigan Law Review, by Fred Shapiro and Michelle Pearse, "The Most-Cited Law Review Article of All Time," Van Alstyne's "The Demise of the Right-Privilege Distinction in Constitutional Law," 81 Harv. L. Rev. 1439 (1968), was included at number 35.

== Testifying in the impeachment of President Clinton ==
His testimony on the potential impeachment of President Bill Clinton during the impeachment inquiry was quoted with approval by the New York Times opinion page, "This point [to strike a balance] was underscored by one of the Republican witnesses, Prof. William Van Alstyne of Duke University Law School. It is 'the prerogative of this Congress,' he observed, 'to express dismay, despair and condemnation' by means short of impeachment. Mindful of the likelihood that impeachment would fail, he urged lawmakers to 'struggle to find a suitable means to express your sense of disappointment. That neatly defines the challenge now confronting the members of Congress. There is nothing in the Constitution to keep them from rising to that task.'"

== Death ==
He died from heart failure on January 29, 2019, aged 84.
