= Beckstrom's law =

In economics, Beckstrom's law is a model or theorem formulated by Rod Beckstrom. It purports to answer "the decades-old question of 'how valuable is a network'", and states in summary that "The value of a network equals the net value added to each user’s transactions conducted through that network, summed over all users."

== Law ==
According to its creator, this law can be used to value any network be it social networks, computer networks, support groups and even the Internet as a whole. This new model values the network by looking from the edge of the network at all of the transactions conducted and the value added to each.

It states that one way to contemplate the value the network adds to each transaction is to imagine the network being shut off and what the additional transactions costs or loss would be. It can thus be compared to the value of a pizza delivery service offered to its customers. If the pizza delivery service shut down, then the social value generated by its deliveries declines, and people will either go hungry or elsewhere. Similarly, a potluck derives its total enjoyment value from the net value produced by each participant's dish. The success of such a gathering hinges on increasing the number of independent guests and their pots, thereby maximizing the amount of "luck" any one guest would have to achieve a satisfactory meal. Assuming one pot per person, a potluck with a set maximum number of guests could produce only a relatively small amount of total potential group satisfaction.

Beckstrom's Law differs from Metcalfe's law, Reed's law and other concepts that proposed that the value of a network was based purely on the size of the network, and in Metcalfe's law, one other variable.

According to Rod Beckstrom, the most significant improvement when using Beckstrom's Law instead of Metcalfe's Law, is the applicability to current experiences on the Internet. Metcalfe's Law does not account for service degradation due to a high number of users or bad actors who steal value from the network.

== As an explicit economic model ==
The net present value V of any network j to any individual i is equal to the sum of the net present value of the benefit of all transactions less the net present value of the costs of all transactions on the network over any given period of time t, as shown in the following equation. The value of the entire network is the summary of the value to all users, who are defined as all parties doing transactions on that network.

$$\sum_{i=1}^n  V_{i,j} = \sum_{i=1}^n \sum_{k=1}^m \frac{B_{i,j,k}-C_{i,j,k}}{(1+r_k)^{t_k}}$$

where:

$\sum V_{i,j}$ = value of a network j to all users

V_{i,j} = net present value of all transactions to user i with respect to network j, over any time period
i identifies one user of the network
j identifies one network
k identifies one transaction
B_{i,j,k} = the benefit value of transaction k to individual i with respect to network j
C_{i,j,k} = the cost of transaction k to individual i with respect to network j
r_{k} = the discount rate of interest to the time of transaction k
t_{k} = the elapsed time in years to transaction k
n = number of individuals
m = number of transactions

== Application to the real world ==
Beckstrom's Law gives an indication on community dynamics that affect the experience of the individual. If consumers use services that are based on funding by a community of people, every member of that community is contributing to delivering the service. As more members join the community they aid funding the services through their contributions, however, these member also demand services for themselves which ultimately can lead to delays and deteriorating quality of the community service. For example, a larger number of members of a golf club lead to more revenue of the golf club, but a larger number of members aids to overcrowding golf courses and delays which has a negative effect on the golfing experience. Beckstrom's Law provides a model that could identify the point at which the marginal effect of each new member's contribution is zero and where adding an additional member makes everybody else worse off.
