= The Starfish and the Spider =

2006 book by Ori Brafman and Rod Beckstrom

- Cover
- Author: Ori Brafman; Rod Beckstrom
- Language: English
- Publisher: Portfolio
- Publication date: October 5, 2006
- Publication place: United States
- Pages: 240
- ISBN: 9781591841432
- OCLC: 67393090

The Starfish and the Spider: The Unstoppable Power of Leaderless Organizations is a 2006 book by Ori Brafman (author of the 2010 book Click: The Magic of Instant Connections) and Rod Beckstrom. It is an exploration of the implications of the rise of decentralized organizations such as Grokster and Wikipedia. The book contrasts them to centralized organizations, such as Encyclopædia Britannica, using compendia of knowledge as examples. The spider and starfish analogy refers to the contrasting biological nature of the respective organisms, starfish having a decentralized neural structure permitting regeneration.

In addition to giving historical examples of decentralized organizations such as Alcoholics Anonymous and the Apaches and analyzing their nature in contrast to centralized organizations, the book considers conflict between centralized and decentralized organizations, including the "If you can't beat them, join them" solution of creating hybrid organizations such as Citizendium. A chapter towards the end of the book explores the concept of the "sweet spot", the optimal mix of decentralized and centralized attributes.

== Summary ==
Don Verelli was an attorney who championed the effort for MGM to crack down on the peer-to-peer music website Grokster. But although the record labels won the lawsuits, other groups such as Kazaa, and eMule surfaced. The authors compare the record companies to "spiders" – organizations under the control of a central brain or leader – while the smaller organizations are more like "starfish" – if a limb is severed, the remaining parts are able to regenerate the entire body, resulting in two or more starfish. The spider organization is compared to the Aztec Empire which fell when Montezuma was defeated by Hernán Cortés and his Spanish army, but the starfish organization is compared to the Apaches, who decentralized and became nomadic, and which the Spanish army could not defeat.

Dave Garrison of Netcom attempts to explain the Internet to executives in Paris, but is met with questions such as who would run the Internet. The authors look into the starfish Alcoholics Anonymous, which survives and thrives even away from the founder. They also look into the history of the music industry since the 19th century from live performers to recording on small labels to ownership from the big five record companies to Napster and other peer-to-peer networks. They list questions that determine whether an organization is more like a spider or a starfish. The authors discuss some founders of starfish organizations: Niklas Zennstrom and Skype; Craig Newmark and Craigslist. They discuss the formation of the Apache software model and how editors work on Wikipedia articles. They then discuss the starfish self-organization of participants in the Burning Man festival.

English lawyer Granville Sharp's decision to defend the freedom of a slave named Jonathan Strong leads him to connect with the Quakers and to advocate for the abolition of the slave trade. The authors use Sharp's story to illustrate five foundational principles called the Five Legs: 1) Circles; 2) The Catalyst; 3) Ideology; 4) The Preexisting Network; 5) The Champion. They apply the Five Legs to the story of Elizabeth Cady Stanton who served as a catalyst to the women's rights movement in the USA with Susan B. Anthony as the champion. They then focus on some examples of catalysts: Jimmy Wales of Wikipedia; Deborah Alvarez-Rodriguez, who worked for the city of San Francisco and later Goodwill; entrepreneur Auren Hoffman and Josh Sage. They list a set of catalyst's tools including: Genuine Interest in Others, Loose Connections, Mapping, Desire to Help, Meet People Where They Are, Emotional Intelligence, Trust, Inspiration, Tolerance for Ambiguity, Hands-Off Approach and Receding. They contrast the work of a catalyst with that of a CEO.

Using the Animal Liberation Front as an example of a decentralized group similar to Al-Qaeda, the authors suggest three strategies of dealing with decentralized groups: Changing Ideology (or introducing better competing ideologies), Centralizing Them (Cow Principle, what defeated the Apaches), and Decentralizing Yourself (If you can't beat 'em, join 'em) The authors suggest organization uses a hybrid model that blends both centralized and decentralized concepts, such as with eBay. They also cite other instances of hybrids such as Amazon.com letting volunteer reviewers contribute and Intuit having a TaxAlmanac website for people to help each other. The authors discuss Peter Drucker's assessment of General Motors's management process, how it led to Toyota taking over the auto industry, and how they later collaborated on the NUMMI plant. Similarly the iTunes model of pricing single songs has been a "sweet spot" for Apple and their online music store, and other companies are moving to an open-source model with their software.

The authors use a series of analogies throughout their book, summarizing their thoughts with Ten Rules: Diseconomies of scale, The network effect, The power of chaos, Knowledge at the edge, Everyone wants to contribute, Beware the hydra response, Catalysts rule, The values are the organization, Measure Monitor and Manage, and Flatten or be flattened.

== See also ==
- Leaderless resistance
- Unorganisation
- The Cathedral and the Bazaar

== Works cited ==
- The Starfish And the Spider: The Unstoppable Power of Leaderless Organizations, Penguin (October 5, 2006), hardcover, 230 pages, ISBN 1-59184-143-7
