= Luohan Academy =

Research institute in Hangzhou, China

- Founder: Jack Ma
- Type: Research institute
- Purpose: Social science and artificial intelligence
- Location: Hangzhou, China
- Region served: Worldwide
- Method: Research, education, training
- Parent organization: Alibaba Group
- Website: www.luohanacademy.com

Luohan Academy is a research institute founded by Alibaba Group in Hangzhou, China, in 2019. The academy is dedicated to advancing the understanding and application of the social sciences and artificial intelligence (AI) to help solve some of the world's most pressing economic and social challenges.

== History ==
Luohan Academy was founded by Jack Ma, the co-founder and former executive chairman of Alibaba Group, in 2019. Ma has long been interested in the intersection of technology and society, and he founded it with the goal of using AI and other advanced technologies to help address some of the world's most pressing economic and social challenges. The Luohan Academy had recruited 15 prominent social scientists to serve on the advisory committee of Alibaba's global think tank that will address socioeconomic issues derived from technological breakthroughs. The academy released a joint declaration explaining how the committee vowed to strengthen coordination in the digital revolution, especially when it comes to big data, machine learning, artificial intelligence, and robotics.

== Research ==
Luohan Academy's research covers a wide range of topics, including economics, finance, psychology, sociology, and philosophy. Its goal is to provide insights that can help policymakers, business leaders, and society as a whole make better decisions and create more sustainable and inclusive economic systems.

One of the academy's key areas of research is the impact of digital technology on society and the economy. The academy has conducted extensive research on the impact of e-commerce and other digital platforms on small and medium-sized enterprises (SMEs), as well as on the role of AI and machine learning in driving innovation and growth.

Alibaba Group in March 2025, released its latest AI reasoning model, QwQ-32B, which performed about as well as its Chinese competitor DeepSeek model R1, in addition to introducing Accio Work for its B2B e-commerce site. In March 2026, Alibaba International rebranded its AI-powered B2B sourcing engine Accio to Accio Work because they felt it was more than just a sourcing engine but rather a full enterprise AI agent platform. The rebranding emphasized Accio Work's new features that helped to create an end-to-end business workflow. Tasks included market analysis, supplier negotiation, compliance, logistics, and marketing for global SME's which was more advanced than a simple source engine. In this way, it was more than a chatbox but more of an agentic AI platform. There is no evidence that the Academy directly created any AI tools that Alibaba is currently using.

In 2023, a South China Morning Post article alleged that Alibaba's founder, Jack Ma's social science institute was set to close. Initially, when Jack founded the institute, he hoped it would exist for 300 years, so this closure seemed abrupt and unannounced. But recent visits to the Luohan Academy found that there are webinars and events scheduled for June 2026, so it seems that it is active. In October 2023, the institute released a public statement stating that it was open and operational after Chinese domestic news outlets reported its closure. A spokesperson stated that there had been an adjustment in Luohan Academy's organizational structure.
