= National Cybersecurity Center =

U.S. non-profit organization

Agency overview
- Formed: March 2016; 10 years ago
- Headquarters: Colorado Springs, United States
- Website: cyber-center.org

The National Cybersecurity Center (NCC) is a 501(c)(3) nonprofit organization founded in 2016 in Colorado Springs, Colorado. The NCC was established following an initiative by Governor John Hickenlooper, in coordination with the University of Colorado Colorado Springs (UCCS) and local community members, offering computer security education, training, and research programs for teachers, students, and other adults.

== Leadership ==
Ed Rios was Chief Executive Officer (CEO) from October 2016 to August 2017. Vance Brown became CEO in 2018. In 2020, Lieutenant General Harry D. Raduege Jr., from the United States Air Force (Ret.), became CEO. In August 2023, Scott Sage was named chief operations officer (COO) after previously leading the development of a new space cybersecurity market at Peraton Inc. Greg Oslan was named chairman of the board and CEO in 2025, replacing Raduege after his retirement.

== Cyber education ==
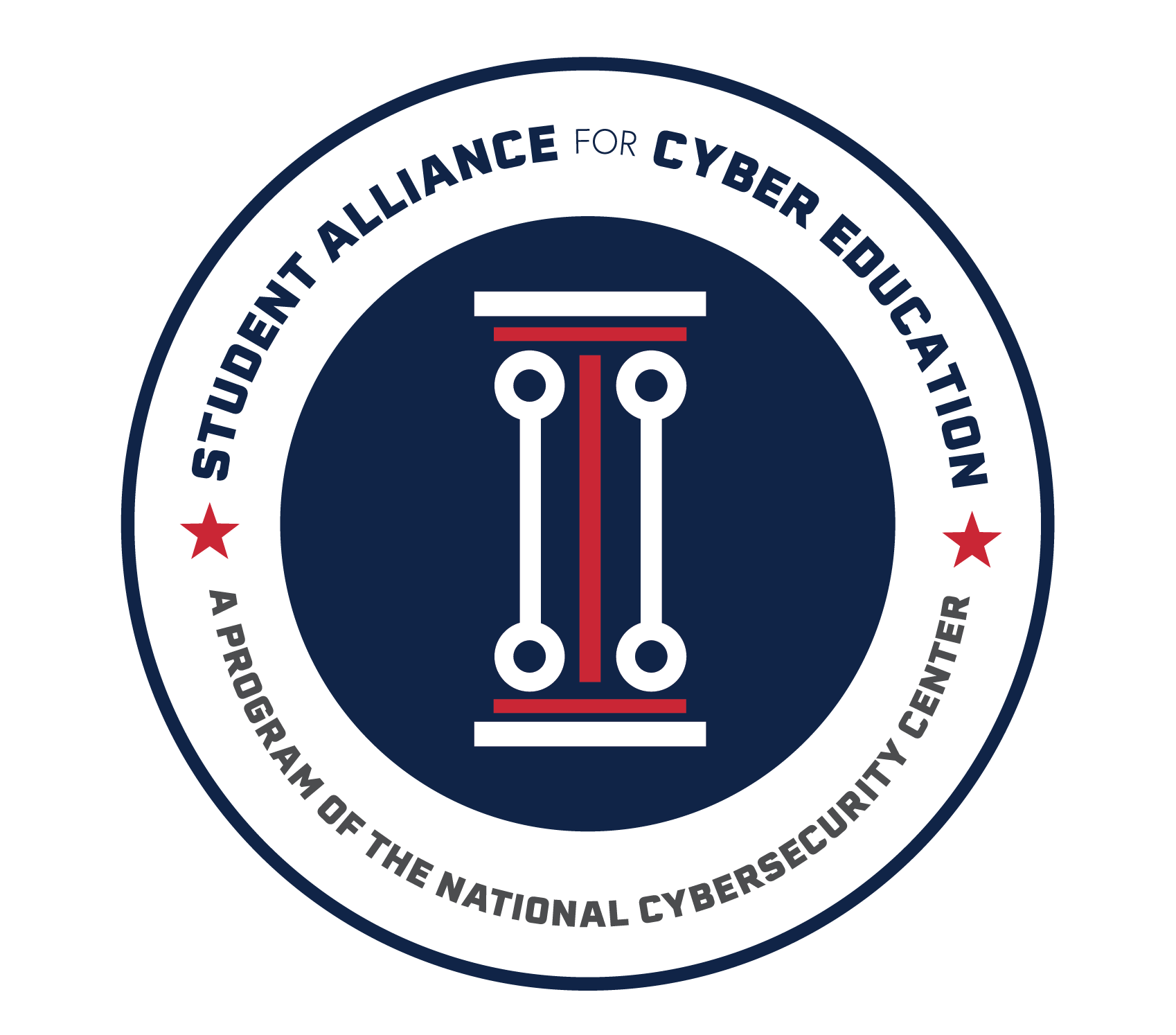
NCC's Cyber Education logo

The NCC provides cybersecurity education for K–12 students through the NCC Student Alliance (NCCSA) and the Adult Education Initiative.

=== Student Alliance ===
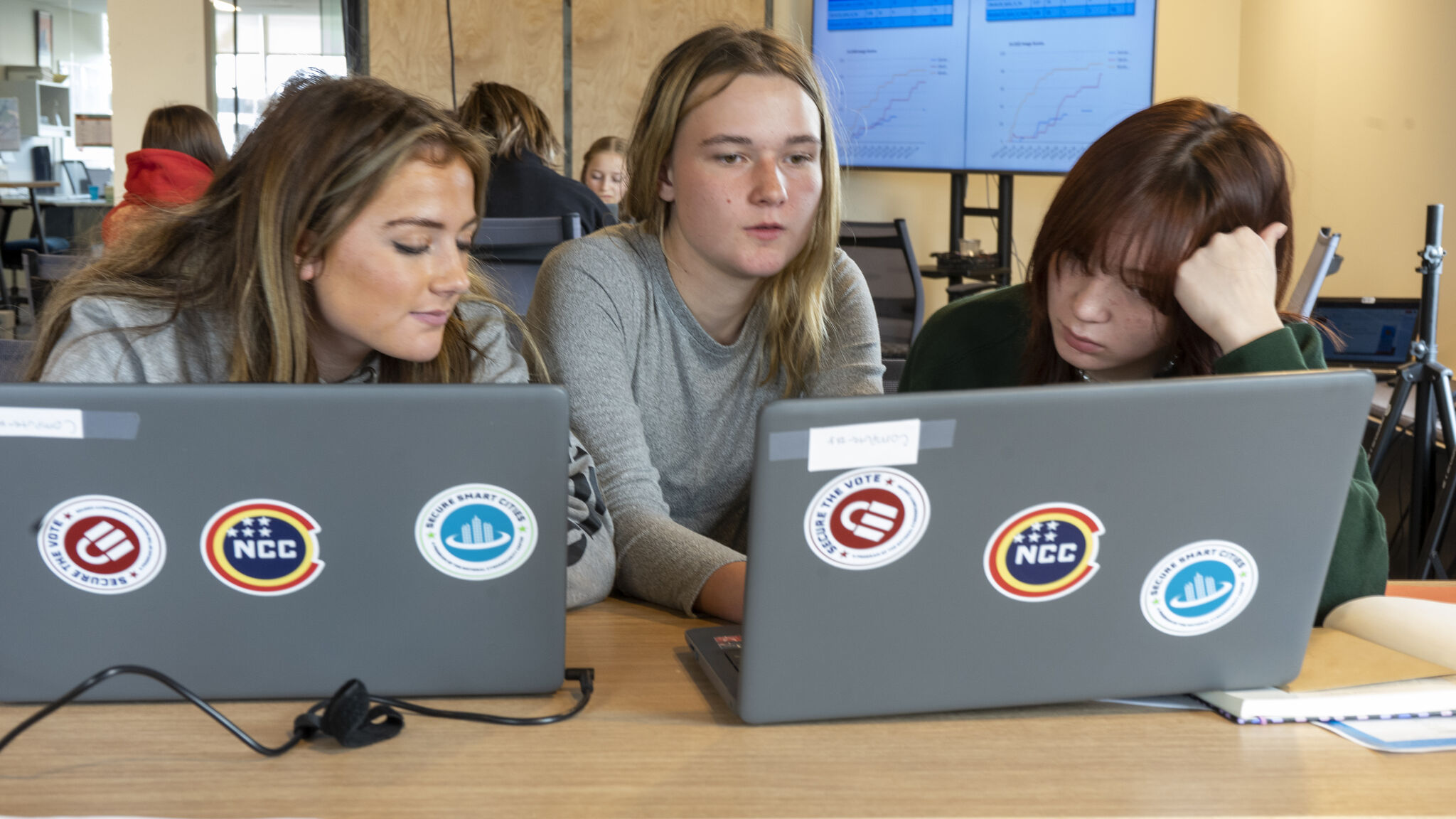
Students collaborating at one of NCC's Cyber Camps

The NCCSA is a student organization focused on cybersecurity education that provides career guidance and academic resources for students interested in cybersecurity.

=== Cyber Force ===
The NCC Cyber Force Initiative is designed to expand the cybersecurity workforce and increase participation by underrepresented groups.

== Space Information Sharing and Analysis Center ==
On April 8, 2019, the NCC announced a partnership with the Space Information Sharing and Analysis Center (Space ISAC), an Information Sharing and Analysis Center focused on space industry threats.

On February 25, 2021, Space ISAC announced that it had reached initial operating capability following the launch of Space ISAC’s member portal and its threat intelligence sharing platform, which allows commercial and international partners to share data on space-related threats.

After a $5.4 million expansion, the Kevin W. O’Neil Cybersecurity Education and Research Center at UCCS houses the Space ISAC. Space ISAC describes itself as the first all-threats security information source for the public and private space sector, operated by the NCC since its formation in 2019.

== NCC-Resolute Cybersecurity app ==
In July 2021, NCC launched the NCC-Resolute Cybersecurity app to promote cybersecurity practices among state lawmakers. The app was co-developed by Resolute CyberStrategies, a division of the risk-analysis firm Resolute Strategic Services. The app provides cybersecurity resources, including a vulnerability assessment that allows lawmakers and their staff to evaluate their cybersecurity readiness.

== See also ==
- National Cyber Security Alliance, which assists U.S. home users, small businesses, and education
- National Cyber Security Centre (disambiguation)
- National Cybersecurity Center of Excellence, which assists businesses
