= Rod Beckstrom =

American writer (born 1961)

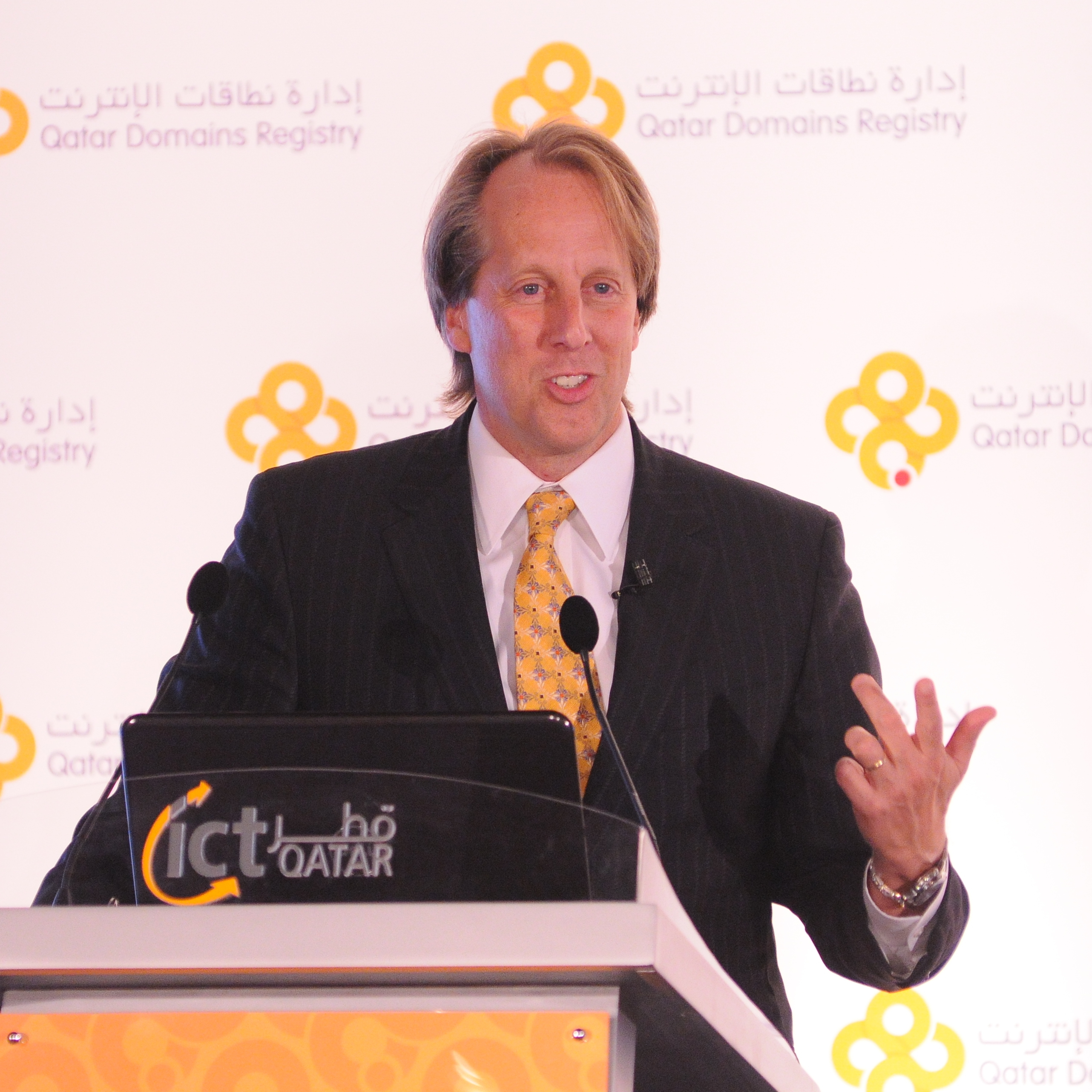
- Born: February 1961 (age 65)
- Education: Stanford University, M.B.A.
- Occupations: American author high-tech entrepreneur
- Website: beckstrom.com

Rod Beckstrom (born February 1961) is an American author, high-tech entrepreneur, and former CEO and President of ICANN. He previously served as Director of the National Cybersecurity Center.

== Education and early work ==
Beckstrom received his BA with Honors and Distinction and an MBA from Stanford University, where he served as the Chairman of the Council of Presidents of the Associated Students of Stanford University.

In August 2007, Beckstrom and Peter Thoeny, author of TWiki co-launched TWIKI.NET, a Web 2.0 company that supports TWiki, an open source wiki. Beckstrom became Chairman and Chief Catalyst. He was also co-founder, Chairman and CEO of CATS Software Inc., a derivatives and risk management software company which went public on NASDAQ and later was sold to Misys PLC.

== Author ==
He is co-author of the best-selling book The Starfish and the Spider, which lays out a new organizational theory for considering all organizations as existing on a continuum between centralized to decentralized, with different implications and strategies for each firm based upon their position on that axis. In interviews with The Washington Post and USA Today, Beckstrom explains how, using the 'Starfish' concept illustrated in The Starfish and the Spider, the U.S. Government can take a different approach in their dealings with Al-Qaeda. Beckstrom is also the formulator of an economic model for valuing networks, Beckstrom's law, which was presented at BlackHat 2009 and Defcon 2009.

== National Cyber Security Center ==
On March 20, 2008, Beckstrom was appointed to run the newly created National Cybersecurity Center, a position requiring "advanced thought leadership in areas like coordination, collaboration and team work in order to best serve the mission".

On March 5, 2009, less than a year after the position was created, he stated that he would resign as the Director of the National Cybersecurity Center (NCSC) on Friday, March 13, 2009. He has recommended the Deputy Director Mary Ellen Seale as his successor. He stated that a lack of cooperation from the NSA and insufficient funding led to his resignation. He stated that he received $500,000 which funded five weeks of operation. He has stated that he supports a more decentralized approach and opposes the NSA's move to try to "rule over" the NCSC.

== Presidency of ICANN ==
Interview with Beckstrom on his time as CEO of ICANN

On 25 June 2009, at its 35th meeting in Sydney, Australia, the Board of ICANN resolved to appoint Rod Beckstrom as its CEO and President. At ICANN, he presided over a number of notable developments, including the 15 July 2010 DNSSEC signing of the DNS root, and the 20 June 2011 opening of the gTLD namespace to additional applicants. On July 1, 2012, he was succeeded as CEO by ICANN's COO as CEO pro tem who served in that capacity until Beckstrom's permanent replacement Fadi Chehade was able to take up his position on 1 October 2012.

== Investor ==
Rod Beckstrom is the lead angel investor in the Encino, CA-based software development company American Legalnet Inc.

== Volunteer work ==
An active participant in the non-profit arena, Beckstrom serves on the board of trustees of Environmental Defense Fund, an organization involved in designing, advocating and implementing environmental policy solutions, such as the Kyoto Protocol and the California Climate Act. He is also a trustee of Jamii Bora Trust, a micro-lending group with 170,000 members, based in Nairobi.
