= Marginal cost of public funds =

The marginal cost of public funds (MCF) is a concept in public finance which measures the loss incurred by society in raising less revenues to finance government spending due to the distortion of resource allocation caused by taxation. Formally, it is defined as the ratio of the marginal value of a monetary unit raised by the government and the value of that marginal private monetary unit. The applications of the marginal cost of public funds include the Samuelson condition for the optimal provision of public goods and the optimal corrective taxation of externalities in public economic theory, the determination of tax-smoothing policy rules in normative public debt analysis and social cost-benefit analysis common in practical policy analysis.

== History ==
The initial statement of the MCF problem is generally attributed to Pigou (1947), who stressed the application of the cost-benefit rule to the financing of public spending. Later, the modification of the Samuelson rule for the optimal provision of public services through the inclusion of a measure of the MCF performed by Stiglitz and Dasgupta (1971), Diamond and Mirrlees (1971) and Atkinson and Stern (1974) proved to be a theoretical milestone. Complementary, Harberger's (1964, 1971) contributions on the issue of excess burden measurement further influenced the development of the MCF concept, though he focused on the average excess burden (AEB) rather than on the MEB. The first attempt at measuring the MEB is commonly attributed to Campbell (1975). Measurement of the MCF, however, was first attempted by Browning (1976), although the inclusion of "substitution effects" impairs his exercise.

== Conceptual foundations ==
The theoretical foundations of the MCF can be found in the excess burden of taxation as measured by equivalent variation, compensating variation and consumer surplus. Relatedly, the social MCF is the basis for the conditions of an optimal tax system and optimal spending on public services. Thus, the outcome of a tax reform can be calculated using pre- and post-reform MCFs as well as price indices. Practically, MCFs can be calculated based on the tax rate and the elasticities of demand and supply. It is consequently related to the (compensating variation-based) marginal excess burden of taxation (MEB), but is comparatively superior in terms of policy analysis.

It is not a net cost, as it isolates the revenue side from the expenditure side of government. For microeconomic analysis, the social weights attributable to the origin and destination unit equally affect the net total.

According to Dahlby (2008), while a substantial literature on the marginal cost of public funds (MCF) has emerged over the last twenty years, much of this literature is fragmented because authors have used different measures for the MCF, or its associated concept, the marginal excess burden (MEB).

== Criticism ==
Jacobs (2018) identifies four problems with respect to the marginal cost of public funds: (1) The lack of consensus in the literature on a common definition of the MCF, notably the dichotomy between the Pigou-Harberger-Browning (PHB) approach using compensated wage elasticities of labor supply and the Atkinson-Stern-Ballard-Fullerton (ASBF) approach using uncompensated wage elasticities of labor supply. (2) Contradicting intuition, standard MCF measures are unequal to one for non-distortionary lump-sum taxes. (3) The normalization of the tax system influences the MCF for both lump-sum and distortionary taxation. (4) Most MCF concepts ignore the reasons for distortionary taxes, namely, redistributional benefits.

== Literature ==
- Bev Dahlby (2008) "The Marginal Cost of Public Funds: Theory and Application", MIT Press, ISBN 978-0-262-04250-5
- Browning, Edgar K. (1976). "The Marginal Cost of Public Funds". Journal of Political Economy. 84 (2): 283–298. doi:10.1086/260432. S2CID 153938800.
- Jacobs, Bas (2018) The marginal cost of public funds is one at the optimal tax system. Int Tax Public Finance, 25:883–912

https://doi.org/10.1007/s10797-017-9481-0
