= Jean-Robert Tyran =

Swiss economist

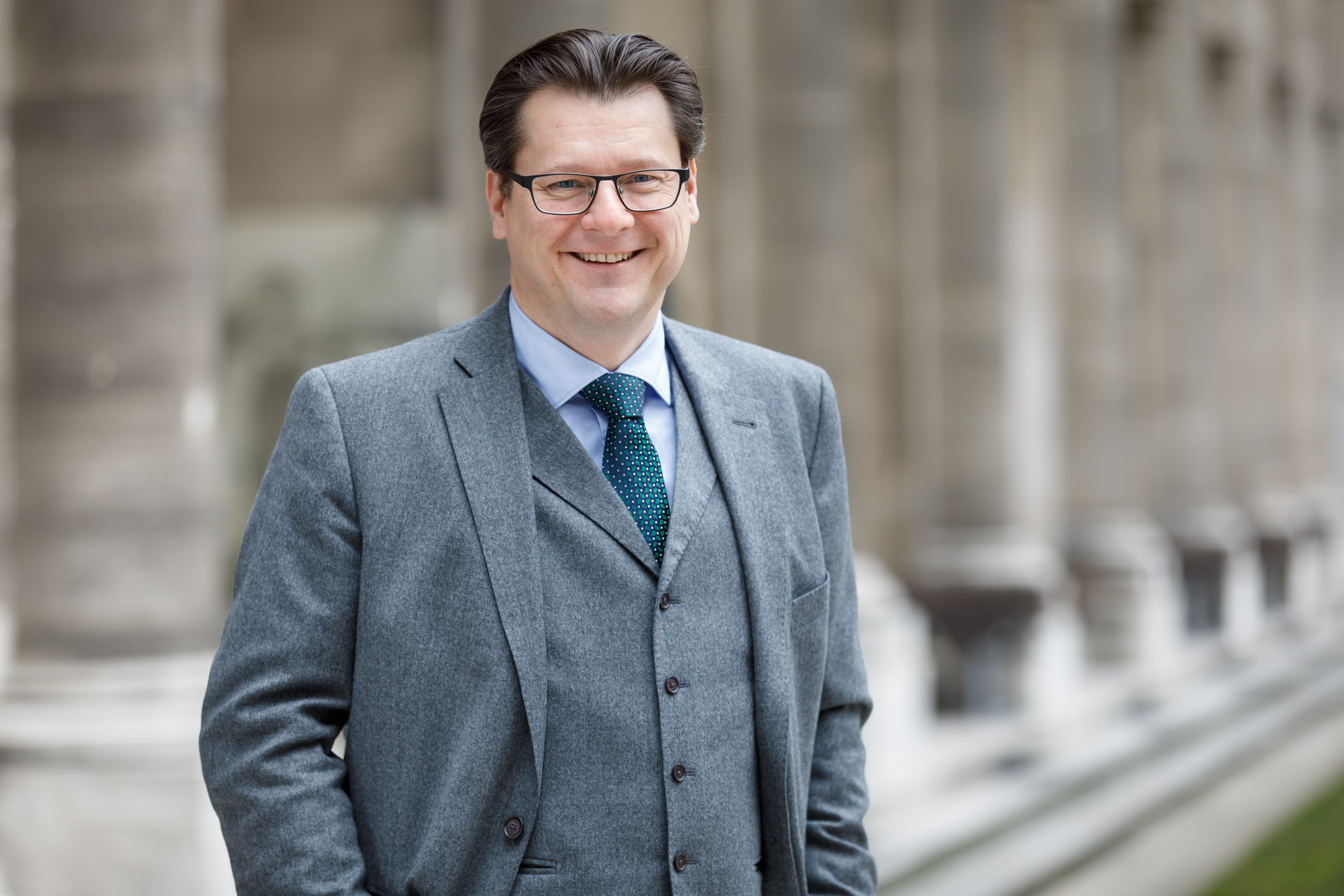
- Born: 29 April 1967 (age 59); Zurich, Switzerland

Academic background
- Education: University of Zurich

Academic work
- Discipline: Behavioral economics
- Institutions: University of Vienna
- Awards: Prix Latsis Universitaire (2004)
- Website: Information at IDEAS / RePEc

Jean-Robert Tyran (29 April 1967) is a Swiss economist. He is professor of public economics and was Vice-Rector for Research and International Affairs at the University of Vienna from 2018 until 2022. His main research areas are behavioral and experimental economics.

== Career ==
Tyran completed his PhD in economics at the University of Zurich in 1997. Until 2004 he was assistant professor at the University of St. Gallen with research stays at the University of Amsterdam, the London School of Economics, the University of Lyon, Stockholm School of Economics, and Harvard Kennedy School. After his habilitation (venia docendi) in 2004, he was first associate professor and since 2005 full professor at the University of Copenhagen. Since 2007 Tyran has been director of the Internet Laboratory for Experimental Economics (iLEE), which he founded. From 2008 to 2014 he acted as director of the Centre for Experimental Economics at the University of Copenhagen. In 2010 he was appointed professor of economics at the University of Vienna. Since 2011 he has been director of the Vienna Center for Experimental Economics (VCEE).

From 2014 to 2016 Tyran served as Vicedean of Research and from 2016 to 2018 as Dean of the Faculty of Business, Economics and Statistics of the University Vienna. In 2018, he was appointed as Vice-Rector for Research and International Affairs. His term of office ended on 30 September 2022.

Tyran has published more than 50 articles in peer-reviewed journals. He is a research fellow at various institutions, including the CEPR London. He is also member of the editorial board of several journals. In 2004 he was awarded the "Prix Latsis Universitaire" of the University of St. Gallen.
