= Public economics =

Study of government economic and fiscal policy

Public economics (or economics of the public sector) is the study of government policy through the lens of economic efficiency and equity. Public economics builds on the theory of welfare economics and is ultimately used as a tool to improve social welfare. Welfare can be defined in terms of well-being, prosperity, and overall state of being.

Public economics provides a framework for thinking about whether or not the government should participate in economic markets and if so to what extent it should do so. Microeconomic theory is utilized to assess whether the private market is likely to provide efficient outcomes in the absence of governmental interference; this study involves the analysis of government taxation and expenditures.

This subject encompasses a host of topics notably market failures such as, public goods, externalities and Imperfect Competition, and the creation and implementation of government policy.

Broad methods and topics include:

- the theory and application of public finance
- Analysis and design of public policy
- distributional effects of taxation and government expenditures
- analysis of market failure and government failure.

Emphasis is on analytical and scientific methods and normative-ethical analysis, as distinguished from ideology. Examples of topics covered are tax incidence, optimal taxation, and the theory of public goods.

== Subject range ==
The Journal of Economic Literature (JEL) classification codes are one way categorizing the range of economics subjects. There, Public Economics, one of 19 primary classifications, has 8 categories. They are listed below with JEL-code links to corresponding available article-preview links of The New Palgrave Dictionary of Economics Online (2008) and with similar footnote links for each respective subcategory if available:

JEL: H (all) – Public Economics
JEL: H0 – General
JEL: H1 – Structure and Scope of Government
JEL: H2 – Taxation, Subsidies, and Revenue
JEL: H3 – Fiscal Policies and Behavior of Economic Agents
JEL: H4 – Publicly Provided Goods
JEL: H5 – National Government Expenditures and Related Policies
JEL: H6 – National Budget, Deficit, and Debt
JEL: H7 – State and Local Government; Intergovernmental Relations
JEL: H8 – Miscellaneous Issues.

== Market failures ==
The role of government in providing efficient and equitable markets is largely underpinned by addressing market failures that may arise. Public Economics focuses on when and to what degree the government should intervene in the economy to address market failures. Some examples of government intervention are providing pure public goods such as defense, regulating negative externalities such as pollution and addressing imperfect market conditions such as asymmetric information.

=== Public goods ===
Pure public goods, or collective consumption goods, exhibit two properties; non-rivalry and non-excludability. Something is non-rivaled if one person's consumption of it does not deprive another person, (to a point) a firework display is non-rivaled - since one person watching a firework display does not prevent another person from doing so. Something is non-excludable if its use cannot be limited to a certain group of people. Again, since one cannot prevent people from viewing a firework display it is non-excludable. Due to these constraints, one of few examples of a "pure public good" is national defense - it is both non-rivalry and non-excludable. Another example, of a pure public good is knowledge. Consider a book. The book itself can be destroyed and thus is excludable. However, the knowledge obtained from the book is far more difficult to destroy and is non-rivalrous and non-excludable. In reality, not all public goods can be classed as 'pure' and most display some degree of excludability and rivalrous. These are known as Impure public goods. To visualize the public good's characteristic of non-excludability, it would be the inability to build a fence, barrier or wall that would block the good from consumption. In the modern era, digital replication allows several goods to be non-rivalry; since, people from all over the world can access it if you have access to the internet and a device.

Due to the two unique properties that public goods exhibit, being non-rivalrous & non-excludable, it is unlikely that without intervention markets will produce the efficient amount. It therefore, the role of government to regulate the production of public goods so as to create an efficient market equilibrium.

=== Externalities ===
Externalities arise when consumption by individuals or production by firms affect the utility or production function of other individuals or firms. Positive externalities are education, public health and others while examples of negative externalities are air pollution, noise pollution, non-vaccination and more.

Pigou describes as positive externalities, examples such as resources invested in private parks that improve the surrounding air, and scientific research from which discoveries of high practical utility often grow. Alternatively, he describes negative externalities, such as the factory that destroys a great part of the amenities of neighboring sites.

The role of government is to address the negative external effects and societal deadweight loss created from inefficient markets

=== Imperfect competition ===
Imperfect competition within markets can take many forms and will often depend on the barriers to entry, firms profit and production objectives and the nature of the product and respective market. Imperfect competition will lead to a social cost and it is the role of government to minimize this cost. Some notable imperfections include:

1. Companies sell differentiated products
2. There are barriers to exit and entry
3. Suboptimal output and pricing

In its essence, the role of government is to address the issues that arise from these market failures and decide the optimal degree of intervention necessary.

== Taxation ==
=== Diamond–Mirrlees efficiency theorem ===
In 1971, Peter A. Diamond and James A. Mirrlees published a seminal paper that showed that even when lump-sum taxation is not available, production efficiency is still desirable. This finding is known as the Diamond–Mirrlees efficiency theorem, and it is widely credited with having modernized Ramsey's analysis by considering the problem of income distribution with the problem of raising revenue. Joseph E. Stiglitz and Partha Dasgupta (1971) have criticized this theorem as not being robust on the grounds that production efficiency will not necessarily be desirable if certain tax instruments cannot be used.

=== Pigouvian taxes ===
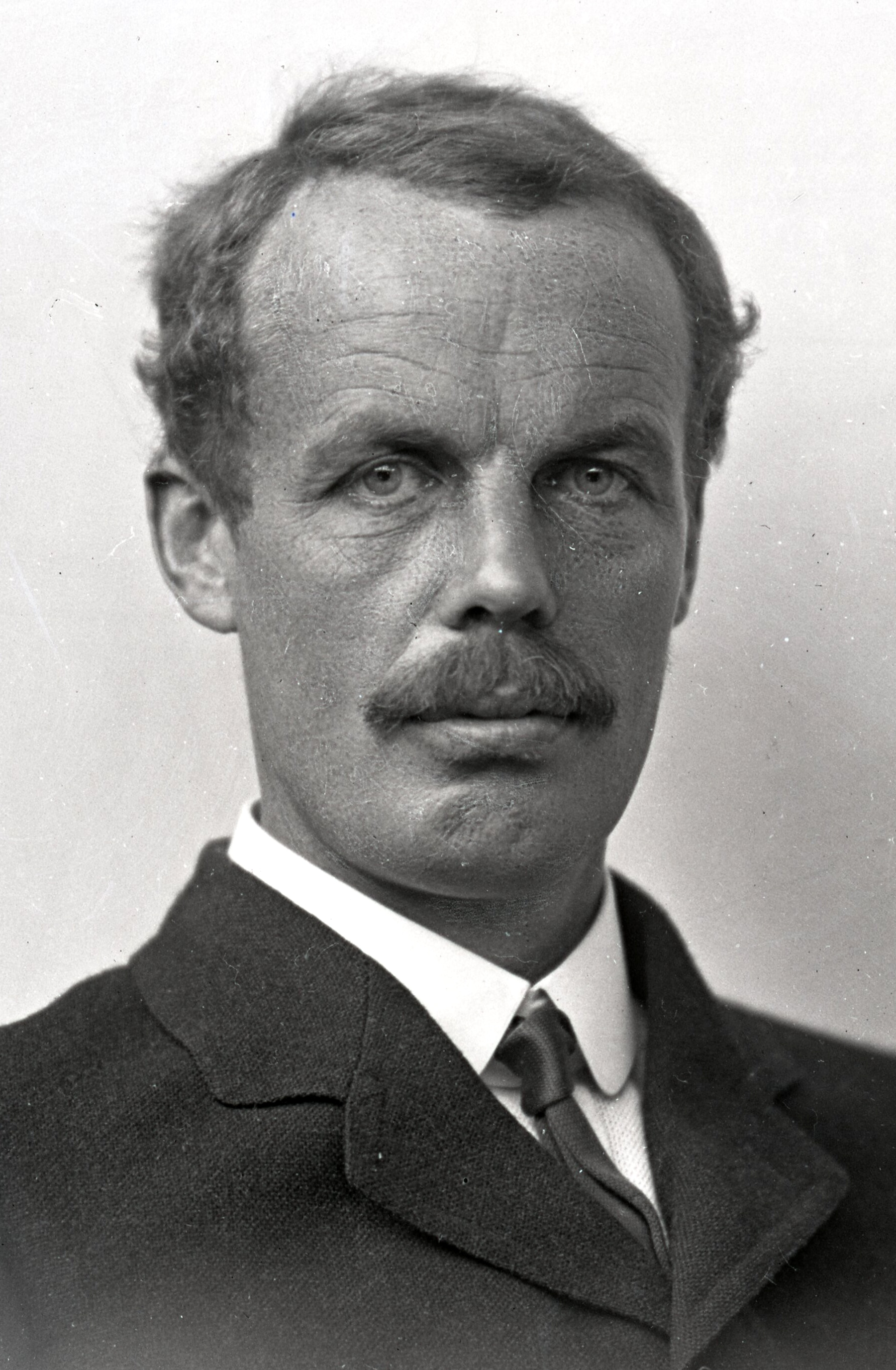
A.C. Pigou (1877-1959).

One of the achievements for which the great English economist A.C. Pigou is known, was his work on the divergences between marginal private costs and marginal social costs (externalities). In his book, The Economics of Welfare (1932), Pigou describes how these divergences come about:

...one person A, in the course of rendering some service, for which payment is made, to a second person B, incidentally also renders services or disservices to other persons (not producers of like services), of such a sort that payment cannot be extracted from the benefited parties or compensation enforced on behalf of the injured parties (Pigou p. 183).

In particular, Pigou is known for his advocacy of what are known as corrective taxes, or Pigouvian taxes:

It is plain that divergences between private and social net product of the kinds we have so far been considering cannot, like divergences due to tenancy laws, be mitigated by a modification of the contractual relation between any two contracting parties, because the divergence arises out of a service or disservice to persons other than the contracting parties. It is, however, possible for the State, if it so chooses, to remove the divergence in any field by "extraordinary encouragements" or "extraordinary restraints" upon investments in that field. The most obvious forms which these encouragements and restraints may assume are, of course, those of bounties and taxes (Pigou p. 192).

Pigou suggested that the market failure of externalities can be overcome by the introduction of taxes. The government can intervene in the market, using an emission tax for example to create a more efficient outcome; this Pigouvian tax is the optimal policy prescription for any aggregate, negative externality.

In 1960, the economist Ronald H. Coase proposed an alternative scheme whereby negative externalities are dealt with through the appropriate assignment of property rights and negotiations between people and firms. This result is known as the Coase theorem and it proposes minimum government intervention.

== Cost–benefit analysis ==
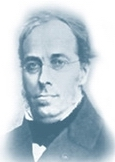
Jules Dupuit (1804-1866).

While the origins of cost–benefit analysis can be traced back to Jules Dupuit's classic article "On the Measurement of the Utility of Public Works" (1844), much of the subsequent scholarly development occurred in the United States and arose from the challenges of water-resource development. In 1950, the U.S. Federal Interagency River Basin Committee's Subcommittee on Benefits and Costs published a report entitled, Proposed Practices for Economic Analysis of River Basin Projects (also known as the Green Book), which became noteworthy for bringing in the language of welfare economics. In 1958, Otto Eckstein published Water-Resource Development: The Economics of Project Evaluation, and Roland McKean published his Efficiency in Government Through Systems Analysis: With Emphasis on Water Resources Development. The latter book is also considered a classic in the field of operations research. In subsequent years, several other important works appeared: Jack Hirshleifer, James DeHaven, and Jerome W. Milliman published a volume entitled Water Supply: Economics, Technology, and Policy (1960); and a group of Harvard scholars including Robert Dorfman, Stephen Marglin, and others published Design of Water-Resource Systems: New Techniques for Relating Economic Objectives, Engineering Analysis, and Governmental Planning (1962).

=== Individual Preferences for Public Goods ===
Public economics involves collective decision making, which can be difficult as individuals in society have different views, including on how much should be spent on public goods. Richer individuals prefer to spend more on both public and private goods than individuals with lower incomes. While both rich and poorer citizens pay the same price for private goods, individuals with higher incomes must pay a relatively higher cost when it comes to public goods. We can calculate this additional expenditure as the tax price; “the additional amount an individual must pay when government expenditures increase by one dollar”. With a higher tax price wealthier individuals will desire a lower expenditure on public goods.

=== Aggregating Preferences ===
An important part of collective decision making in a democracy, and thus public economics, is aggregating preferences of all individuals in society. To aggregate preferences, however, the decision-making body (i.e. the government) must first ascertain the preferences of the citizens. We can call this process preference revelation, and in terms of public economics, the objective is to determine the “desired level of public goods of each individual”. This can be a very difficult process in practice. In most democratic countries, citizens vote for representatives that best emulate their preferences. This process can be perverted in a number of ways including lobbying, media biases, political advertising, and special interest groups.

Another aspect of this public choice paradigm was identified by Anthony Downs in 1957, when he wrote that “parties formulate policies to win elections, rather than win elections to formulate policies”. The argument is that political parties and candidates are motivated primarily by self-interest, and “the income, prestige and power which come from being in office". This can sometimes lead to difficult outcomes and can make it harder to properly aggregate the preferences of the population and can potentially lead to the favouring of the welfare of government officials as opposed to public welfare.

Social Choice Theory

Social choice theory in economics studies how groups end up making decisions as opposed to individuals. One of the central components of social choice theory is that government actions result from individuals acting out of rational self-interest within the confines of the “rules of the game”. In this sense, the constitution of a given country is a significant factor in what actions a government can take (i.e. limits on deficit spending). One of the pioneers in this field was the American economist James Buchanan, who emphasized the role of the constitution in setting out the rules of the game. The idea is that without restraints in place, there will be natural incentives for the majority to redistribute income in away from the minority in their favour. There is also the threat of special interest groups influencing elected representatives to act in their favour, at the expense of the public interest, and without appropriate rules in place these temptations will naturally be capitalized on.

== See also ==
- Education economics
- Health economics
- Mixed economy
- Public finance
- Rawlsian social welfare function
- Welfare economics
