= Tony Atkinson =

British economist (1944–2017)

Sir Tony Atkinson CBE FBA
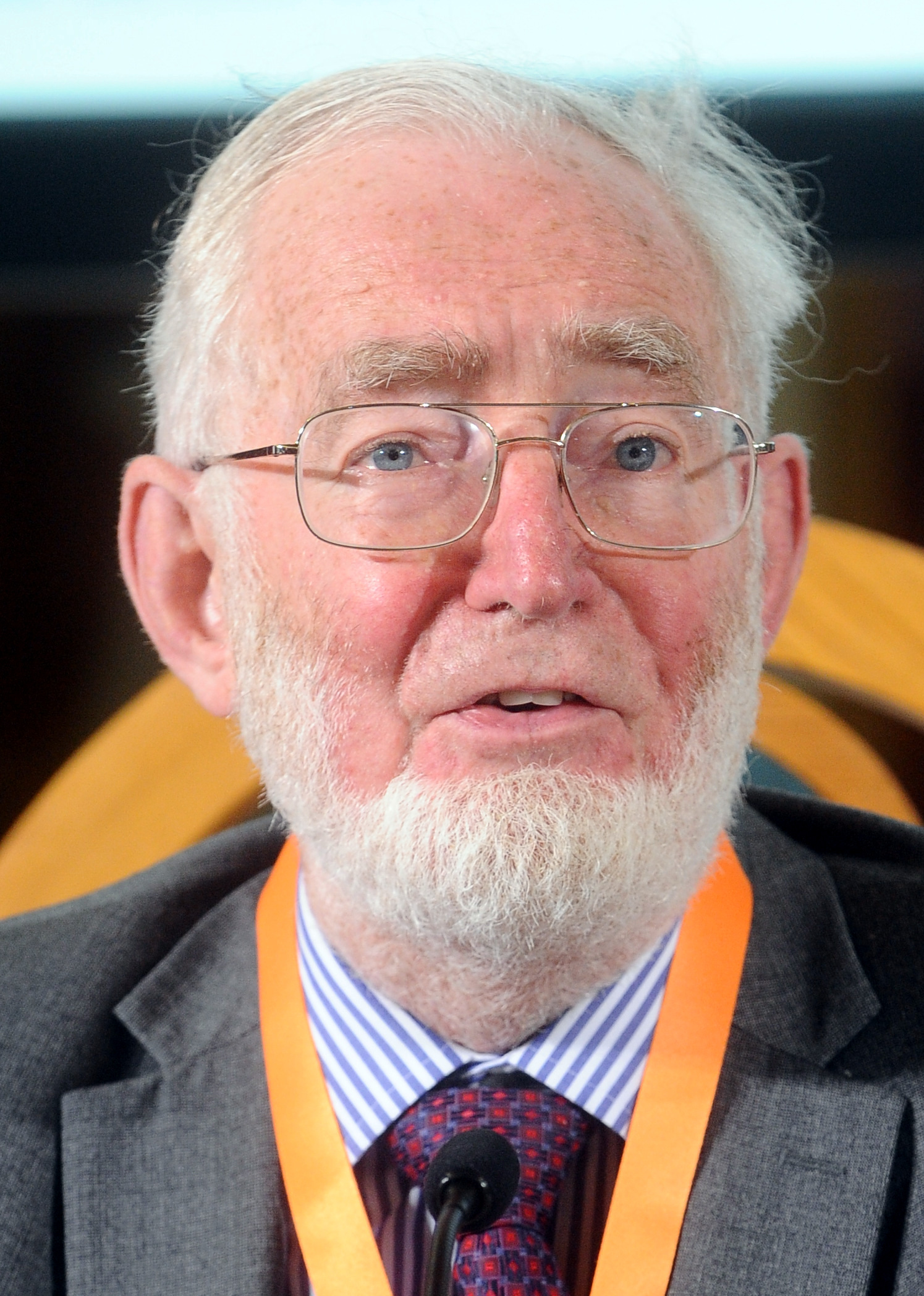
- Tony Atkinson at the Festival of Economics in Trento, May 2015
- Born: Anthony Barnes Atkinson; 4 September 1944; Caerleon, Wales, United Kingdom
- Died: 1 January 2017 (aged 72); Oxford, England, United Kingdom
- Spouse: Judith Mandeville

Academic background
- Education: Cambridge University
- Influences: James Meade

Academic work
- Discipline: Economics of income distribution, poverty, micro-economics
- School or tradition: Neo-Keynesian economics
- Institutions: Nuffield College, Oxford; London School of Economics
- Doctoral students: John Micklewright; Asghar Zaidi
- Website: Information at IDEAS / RePEc

Sir Anthony Barnes Atkinson CBE FBA (4 September 1944 – 1 January 2017) was a British economist, Centennial Professor at the London School of Economics, and senior research fellow of Nuffield College, Oxford.

A student of James Meade, Atkinson virtually single-handedly established the modern British field of inequality and poverty studies. He worked on inequality and poverty for over four decades.

== Education and career ==
Atkinson was born in Caerleon, a town in southern Wales near the border with England. Atkinson grew up in north Kent and attended Cranbrook School.

After leaving school at the age of 17 he worked for IBM. After one year he left and moved to Hamburg to volunteer in a hospital in a deprived part of town. He cited his interest in inequality as beginning from this period as a volunteering in a German hospital and from studying the work of Peter Townsend.

After studying mathematics at Churchill College, Cambridge, for one year he changed to economics, graduating from the University of Cambridge in 1966 with a first-class degree. Subsequently, he spent time at the Massachusetts Institute of Technology. At MIT he attended Robert Solow's seminal growth theory course and worked as a research assistant of Solow. After returning from MIT he considered writing a PhD thesis on development economics, but never did a PhD.

From 1967 to 1971 he was a fellow at St John's College, Cambridge. There he taught public economics together with Joseph Stiglitz. These lectures were later turned into the famous textbook “Lectures on Public Economics”.

In 1971, at the age of 27, he became full professor of economics at the University of Essex. In 1976 he became professor of political economy at University College London.

During the 1980s he was Tooke Professor of Economic Science and Statistics in the Economics Department at the London School of Economics. At the LSE he co-directed for 12 years the research programme ‘Taxation, incentives and the distribution of income’. His co-directors were Nick Stern and Mervyn King. He stayed there until 1992 when he returned to the University of Cambridge for two more years.

In the 1990s he was advisor to the French Prime Minister Lionel Jospin.

He served as Warden of Nuffield College, Oxford, from 1994 to 2006. In 1971 he founded the Journal of Public Economics. He co-edited it for the next quarter century.

== Principles ==
Several authors have emphasized that some core principles motivate Atkinson's work.

Atkinson became first interested in economics because of his experiences in Hamburg of the 1960s, but also credited the book The Poor and the Poorest, by Brian Abel-Smith and Peter Townsend, as having a large influence on his career goals. He was impressed by this account of poverty. At the same time he 'felt that it did not address what to do about the problem'. This motivated him to provide this missing piece and he published his answer in 'Poverty in Britain and the Reform of Social Security' in 1969.

The same was true for the study of inequality. He mentored Thomas Piketty and collaborated with him repeatedly. But he felt that his analysis in Capital was a description of the problem, what was missing was the solution. This again motivated Atkinson 'to go further and show how inequality could actually be reduced in practice' and to write 'Inequality – what can be done?'.

Several have remarked on Atkinson's optimism that progress is possible.

Atkinson's colleague Max Roser wrote that 'one of [Atkinson's] convictions – apparent in all his writing – was that high levels of economic inequality are not inevitable. Even when the public discourse suggested that nothing could be done to counter the rise of inequality, Tony not only stood by his conviction, but wrote an entire book entitled Inequality – What can be done?'.

In turn, Atkinson also emphasized the optimism of his teacher James Meade writing, 'Above all, James had a positive vision for the future. He was, in his own words, ‘an inveterate explorer of improvements in economic arrangements’... he wrote that ‘I implore any of my fellow countrymen who read this book not to object: “It can’t be done.” He was ultimately concerned with what could be done to make our world a better place.'

== Work ==
Atkinson's work was predominantly on income distributions. But he also worked on a wide field of other economic and social questions including taxation, wealth distribution, the economics of the welfare state, health economics, and poverty. In his long career he published over 350 research papers and authored 24 books. Characteristic for much of his work is a combination of theoretical and applied perspectives.

=== Inequality ===
His 1970 paper 'On the measurement of inequality' radically changed the way that economists think about the measurement of inequality. One contribution of this paper is that it introduced a new family of inequality measures that makes different views about distributional justice explicit through a parameter capturing the ‘inequality aversion’ of the measurer. This inequality measure–called the Atkinson index–is named after him.

Atkinson examined how the wealthy disproportionately influence public policy and influence governments to implement policies that protect wealth. He presented a set of policies regarding technology, employment, social security, the sharing of capital, and taxation that could shift the inequality in income distribution in developed countries. He also advocated the introduction of a basic income.

He was one of the authors of the Chartbook of Economic Inequality, a resource widely employed to study the history of inequality.

=== Global poverty ===
He had a long-standing interest in the measurement of poverty. One of his most cited research papers is ‘On the measurement of poverty' from 1987.

From 2013 to 2016 he chaired the World Bank's Commission on Global Poverty. The commission included Amartya Sen, Ana Revenga, François Bourguignon, Stefan Dercon and Nora Lustig and had the objective to advise the international institutions on how to measure and monitor global poverty. The commission is usually referred to as the Atkinson Commission.

Before his death he was working on a book on global poverty. Atkinson died before he was able to complete the book, but at his request it was edited for publication by two of his colleagues, John Micklewright and Andrea Brandolini. This book–'Measuring Poverty around the World'–was published posthumously in May 2019.

=== Public economics ===
Since the 1960s he was one of the leading scholars to develop the discipline of public economics.

In a joint article with Joseph Stiglitz, he laid one of the cornerstones for the theory of optimal taxation.

Also jointly with Joseph Stiglitz he authored the seminal textbook “Lectures on Public Economics”. The book was reissued by Princeton University Press in 2015.

In his 2015 publication Inequality: What Can Be Done?, he "called for robust taxation of the rich whom he reckons have got off easily over the last generation."

He recommended government intervention in markets such as employment guarantees and wage controls to influence the redistribution of economic rewards. He traced the history of inequality, coining the phrase the "inequality turn" to describe the period when household inequality began to rise around 1980. From the 1980s onwards, men and women "tended to marry those who earned like themselves", with rich women marrying rich men. As more women joined the workforce inequality increased.

== Influences ==
Atkinson, who worked on inequality and poverty for more than four decades, was a mentor to Thomas Piketty (author of Capital in the Twenty-First Century); they worked together on building an historical database on top incomes. Piketty described him as "the godfather of historical studies of income and wealth."

Nobel laureate Angus Deaton recalled the first economics seminar he ever attended: "the first seminar I ever heard in economics, in Cambridge in 1969, was Tony presenting his famous paper on the measurement of inequality. It made me think that economics was a pretty cool subject, I thought all economics talks were like this, and it ruined me for a lifetime of seminars."

He had a large influence on the next generation of researchers. Atkinson advised at least sixty PhD students and 'in addition there are many other younger scholars whom he influenced directly through his collaboration on joint research project'.

== Membership and honours ==
He was elected a Fellow of the British Academy in 1984, a Fellow of the Econometric Society in 1974, Honorary Member of the American Economic Association in 1985 and Foreign Honorary Member of the American Academy of Arts and Sciences in 1994.

He was President of the Econometric Society in 1988. He was knighted in 2000 and made a Chevalier de la Légion d'Honneur in 2001. He was the first person to be honoured with the A.SK Social Science Award by the Wissenschaftszentrum Berlin für Sozialforschung (WZB Social Science Center in Berlin) in 2007. He was president of the board of the Luxembourg Income Study, having advised on its creation in the 1980s.

In 2016, Atkinson received the Dan David Prize for 'combatting poverty'.

He received 19 honorary doctorates.

== Personal life and death ==
Atkinson was married to Judith Mandeville, whom he met at Cambridge as an undergraduate. The couple had three children and eight grandchildren.

He was a sailor and walker.

Atkinson died on 1 January 2017 from multiple myeloma in Oxford, England, aged 72.

== Bibliography ==
=== Books ===
- Atkinson, Anthony B.; Harrison, Allan J. (1978). Distribution of personal wealth in Britain. Cambridge New York: Cambridge University Press. ISBN 9780521217354.
- Atkinson, Anthony B.; Stiglitz, Joseph E. (1980). Lectures on public economics. London New York: McGraw-Hill Book Co. ISBN 9780070841055.
- Atkinson, Anthony B. (1983). The economics of inequality. Oxford Oxfordshire New York: Clarendon Press Oxford University Press. ISBN 9780198772088.
- Atkinson, Anthony B. (1995). Incomes and the welfare state: essays on Britain and Europe. Cambridge New York: Cambridge University Press. ISBN 9780521557962.
- Atkinson, Anthony B. (1996). Public economics in action: the basic income/flat tax proposal. Oxford New York: Oxford University Press. ISBN 9780198292166.
- Atkinson, Anthony B. (1999). The economic consequences of rolling back the welfare state. Cambridge, Massachusetts: MIT Press. ISBN 9780262011716.
- Atkinson, Anthony B.; Bourguignon, François (2000). Handbook of income distribution. Amsterdam New York: Elvesier. ISBN 9780444816313.
- Atkinson, Anthony B; Stern, Nicholas H.; Glennerster, Howard (2000). Putting economics to work: volume in honour of Michio Morishima. Vol. 22. London: London School of Economics and Political Science, and the STICERD – Suntory-Toyota International Centre for Economics and Related Disciplines. ISBN 9780753013991.
- Atkinson, Anthony B. (2004). New sources of development finance. Oxford New York: Oxford University Press. ISBN 9780199278558.
- Atkinson, Anthony B.; Piketty, Thomas (2007). Top incomes over the Twentieth Century: a contrast between Continental European and English-speaking countries. Oxford New York: Oxford University Press. ISBN 9780199286881.
- Atkinson, Anthony B. (2008). The changing distribution of earnings in OECD countries. Oxford New York: Oxford University Press. ISBN 9780199532438.
- Atkinson, Anthony B.; Piketty, Thomas (2010). Top incomes: a global perspective. Oxford New York: Oxford University Press. ISBN 9780199286898.
- Atkinson, Anthony B. (2014). Public economics in an age of austerity. New York: Routledge. ISBN 9781138018150.
- Atkinson, Anthony B. (2014). Inequality: What Can Be Done?. Harvard University Press. p. 384. ISBN 9780674504769.
- Atkinson, Anthony B. (2019). Measuring Poverty around the World, Princeton University Press.

=== Chapters in books ===
- Atkinson, Anthony B. (2002), "Globalization and the European welfare state at the opening and the closing of the twentieth century", in Kierzkowski, Henryk (ed.), Europe and globalization, Houndmills, Basingstoke, Hampshire New York: Palgrave Macmillan, pp. 249–273, ISBN 9780333998397
- Atkinson, Anthony B. (2008), "Concentration among the rich", in Davies, James B (ed.), Personal wealth from a global perspective, Oxford New York: Oxford University Press, pp. 64–89, ISBN 9780199548897
- Atkinson, Anthony B. (2009), "Welfare economics and giving for development", in Kanbur, Ravi; Basu, Kaushik (eds.), Arguments for a better world: essays in honor of Amartya Sen | Volume I: Ethics, welfare, and measurement, Oxford New York: Oxford University Press, pp. 489–500, ISBN 9780199239115

=== Journal articles ===
- Atkinson, Anthony B. (2003). "Income inequality in OECD countries: data and explanations" (PDF). CESifo Economic Studies (Munich). 49 (4): 479–513. doi:10.1093/cesifo/49.4.479. S2CID 154990724.
- Atkinson, Anthony B. (October 2003). "Social Europe and social science". Social Policy and Society. 2 (4): 261–72. doi:10.1017/S1474746403001428. S2CID 145787541.
- Atkinson, Anthony B. (March 2007). "The long run earnings distribution in five countries: "remarkable stability", U, V or W?". Review of Income and Wealth. 53 (1): 1–24. doi:10.1111/j.1475-4991.2007.00215.x. (Pdf)
- Atkinson, Anthony B. (October 2009). "Economics as a moral science". Economica. 76 (s1): 791–804. doi:10.1111/j.1468-0335.2009.00788.x. S2CID 154278392.
- Atkinson, Anthony B. (May 2011). "The restoration of welfare economics". American Economic Review. 101 (3): 157–61. doi:10.1257/aer.101.3.157.

== See also ==
- Atkinson–Stiglitz theorem
- Universal basic income in the United Kingdom

Educational offices
| Preceded by Kaushik Basu | President of the Human Development and Capability Association; September 2012 – September 2014 | Succeeded by Henry S. Richardson |
