= Single-crossing condition =

Condition in monotone comparative statics

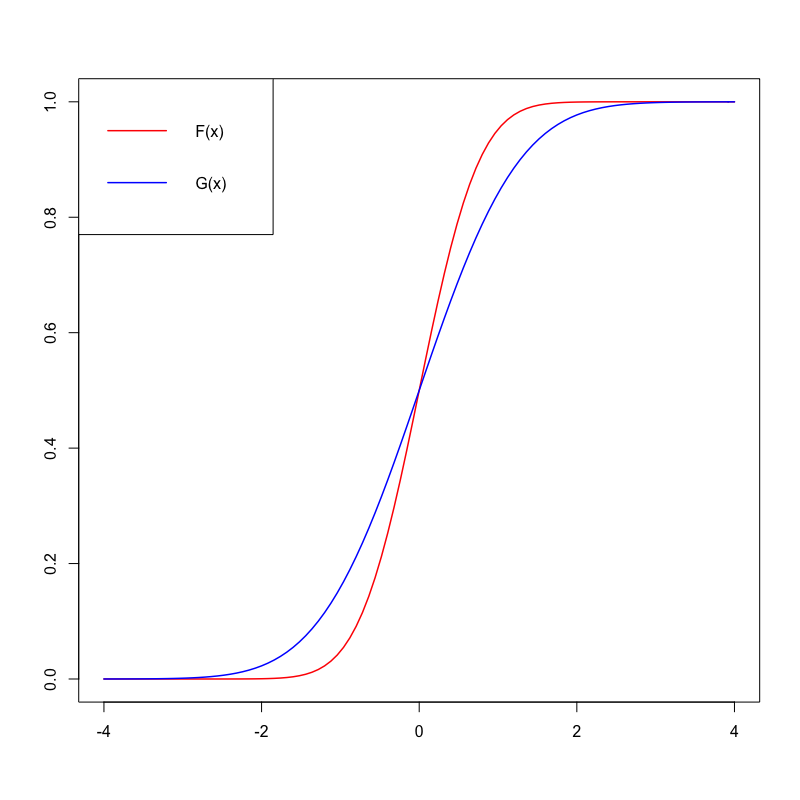
Example of two cumulative distribution functions F(x) and G(x) which satisfy the single-crossing condition.

In monotone comparative statics, the single-crossing condition or single-crossing property refers to a condition where the relationship between two or more functions (Note: The property need not only relate to continuous functions but can also similarly describe ordered sets or lattices.) is such that they will only cross once. For example, a mean-preserving spread will result in an altered probability distribution whose cumulative distribution function will intersect with the original's only once.

The single-crossing condition was posited in Samuel Karlin's 1968 monograph 'Total Positivity'. It was later used by Peter Diamond, Joseph Stiglitz, and Susan Athey, in studying the economics of uncertainty.

The single-crossing condition is also used in applications where there are a few agents or types of agents that have preferences over an ordered set. Such situations appear often in information economics, contract theory, social choice and political economics, among other fields.

== Example using cumulative distribution functions ==
Cumulative distribution functions F and G satisfy the single-crossing condition if there exists a $y^*$ such that

$\forall x, x \ge y^* \implies F(x) \ge G(x)$

and

$\forall x, x \le y^* \implies F(x) \le G(x)$;

that is, function $h(x) = F(x)-G(x)$ crosses the x-axis at most once, in which case it does so from below.

This property can be extended to two or more variables. Given x and t, for all x'>x, t'>t,

$F(x',t) \ge F(x,t) \implies F(x',t') \ge F(x,t')$

and

$F(x',t) > F(x,t) \implies F(x',t') > F(x,t')$.

This condition could be interpreted as saying that for x'>x, the function g(t)=F(x',t)-F(x,t) crosses the horizontal axis at most once, and from below. The condition is not symmetric in the variables (i.e., we cannot switch x and t in the definition; the necessary inequality in the first argument is weak, while the inequality in the second argument is strict).

== Use in social choice and mechanism design ==
=== Social choice ===
In social choice theory, the single-crossing condition is a condition on preferences. It is especially useful because utility functions are generally increasing (i.e. the assumption that an agent will prefer or at least consider equivalent two dollars to one dollar is unobjectionable).

Specifically, a set of agents with some unidimensional characteristic $\alpha^i$ and preferences over different policies q satisfy the single crossing property when the following is true:

If $q > q'$ and $\alpha^{i'} > \alpha^i$ or if $q < q'$ and $\alpha^{i'} < \alpha^i$, then $W(q;\alpha^i)\ge W(q';\alpha^i) \implies W(q;\alpha^{i'})\ge W(q';\alpha^{i'})$

where W is the indirect utility function.

An important result extends the median voter theorem, which states that when voters have single peaked preferences, there is a majority-preferred candidate corresponding to the median voter's most preferred policy. With single-crossing preferences, the most preferred policy of the voter with the median value of $\alpha^i$ is the Condorcet winner. In effect, this replaces the unidimensionality of policies with the unidimensionality of voter heterogeneity. In this context, the single-crossing condition is sometimes referred to as the Gans-Smart condition.

=== Mechanism design ===
In mechanism design, the single-crossing condition (often referred to as the Spence-Mirrlees property for Michael Spence and James Mirrlees, sometimes as the constant-sign assumption) refers to the requirement that the isoutility curves for agents of different types cross only once. This condition guarantees that the transfer in an incentive-compatible direct mechanism can be pinned down by the transfer of the lowest type. This condition is similar to another condition called strict increasing difference (SID). Formally, suppose the agent has a utility function $V(q,\theta)$, the SID says $\forall q_2>q_1,\theta_2>\theta_1$ we have $V(q_2,\theta_2)-V(q_1,\theta_2)>V(q_2,\theta_1)-V(q_1,\theta_1)$. The Spence-Mirrlees Property is characterized by $\frac{\partial^2V}{\partial\theta\partial q}(q,\theta)>0$.

== See also ==
- Brouwer fixed-point theorem
