= Corlett–Hague rule =

Rule in the economics of optimal taxation

The Corlett–Hague rule is a rule in the economics of optimal taxation, which follows the second best approach, and states that optimal taxation can be achieved by taxing complementary goods of leisure, thereby reducing the distortion of labor supply incentives. It was developed by W.J. Corlett and D.C. Hague in 1953, and is derived from the principles of optimal taxation derived by Frank P. Ramsey. The Corlett–Hague rule has multiple applications in tax policy such as in commodity taxation or capital income taxation.
