= Excess burden of taxation =

Economic loss due to taxes or subsidies

In economics, the excess burden of taxation is one of the economic losses that society suffers as the result of taxes or subsidies. Economic theory posits that distortions change the amount and type of economic behavior from that which would occur in a free market without the tax. Excess burdens can be measured using the average cost of funds or the marginal cost of funds (MCF). Excess burdens were first discussed by Adam Smith.

An equivalent kind of inefficiency can also be caused by subsidies (which technically can be viewed as taxes with negative rates). The excess burden of taxation is also known as the deadweight loss from taxation.

Economic losses due to taxes have been evaluated to be as low as 2.5 cents per dollar of revenue, and as high as 30 cents per dollar of revenue (on average), and even much higher at the margins.

== Measures of the excess burden ==
The cost of a distortion is usually measured as the amount that would have to be paid to the people affected by its supply, the greater the excess burden. The second is the tax rate: as a general rule, the excess burden of a tax increases with the square of the tax rate.

The average cost of funds is the total cost of distortions divided by the total revenue collected by a government. In contrast, the marginal cost of funds (MCF) is the size of the distortion that accompanied the last unit of revenue raised (i.e. the rate of change of distortion with respect to revenue). In most cases, the MCF increases as the amount of tax collected increases.

A common position in economics is that the costs in a cost-benefit analysis for any tax-funded project should be increased according to the marginal cost of funds, because that is close to the deadweight loss that will be experienced if the project is added to the budget, or to the deadweight loss removed if the project is removed from the budget.

== Distortion and redistribution ==
In the case of progressive taxes, the distortionary effects of a tax may be accompanied by other benefits: the redistribution of dollars from wealthier people to poorer people who could possibly obtain more benefit from them - in effect reducing economic inequalities and improving GDP growth.

In fact almost any tax measure will distort the economy from the path or process that would have prevailed in its absence. For example, a sales tax applied to all goods will tend to discourage consumption of all the taxed items, and an income tax will tend to discourage people from earning money in the category of income that is taxed (unless they can manage to avoid being taxed). Some people may move out of the work force (to avoid income tax); some may move into the cash or black economies (where incomes are not revealed to the tax authorities).

For example, in Western nations the incomes of the relatively affluent are taxed partly to provide the money used to assist the relatively poor. As a result of the taxes (and associated subsidies to the poor), incentives are changed for both groups. The relatively rich are discouraged from declaring income and from earning marginal (extra) income, because they know that any additional money that they earn and declare will be taxed at their highest marginal tax rates. At the same time the poor have an incentive to conceal their own taxable income (and usually their assets) so as to increase the likelihood of their receiving state assistance (welfare trap).

There was an example of distortion of the economy by tax policy some years ago in the UK when cars supplied by employers to their employees were taxed at advantageous rates (e.g. encouraging the growth of company car fleets). Over several years the distortion grew to the point that the majority of cars used by working families were company cars and the dealership structures, and even the types of cars used, altered to adjust to the tax regime.

== Deliberate distortion ==
Pigovian taxes create distortions intended to correct for externalities and produce a negative MCF.

Here, the fiscal distortion is deliberate, so as to compensate for externalities. "Sin taxes" are levied on products that incur additional costs to society, such as alcohol, tobacco and pollution. Ideally, these taxes raise the price to the exact level that the market would bear if the negative externalities were included in the price. Pigovian taxes are often preferable to outright prohibition, since prohibition incites trafficking, often resulting in crime and other social costs, but no tax revenue.

== See also ==
- EBCOR
- Effect of taxes and subsidies on price
- Laffer curve
- Land value tax
- Lump-sum tax
- Optimal tax
- Tax incidence
