= Mirrlees Review =

2010 review of the UK tax system

The Mirrlees Review was a comprehensive review of the UK tax system undertaken in 2010, chaired by the Nobel laureate Sir James Mirrlees for the Institute for Fiscal Studies. The findings were launched in November 2010 and were published by Oxford University Press in two volumes. The report argued that it was possible for governments to raise the same revenues at significantly lower cost than the current system of taxation and submitted recommendations to support this notion.

== Panel ==
The review panel members were:

- Sir James Mirrlees
- Stuart Adam
- Timothy Besley
- Richard Blundell
- Stephen Bond
- Robert Chote
- Malcolm Gammie
- Paul Johnson
- Gareth Myles
- James Poterba

== Key Principles ==
The report was based on the following key principles. A tax system should:

1. Be designed as a whole in conjunction with a benefits system
2. Seek to be neutral and minimise distortion in the market
3. Be progressive as efficiently as possible

== Recommendations ==
The report recommendations included subjects of taxation of earnings, indirect taxes, taxation of housing, environmental taxes, taxes on savings and business taxes. Specifically, the report recommended the introduction of a land value tax, consistent carbon pricing, the replacement of inheritance tax with a lifetime wealth transfer tax, the replacement of fuel duty with well-targeted congestion pricing, a single integrated benefit for those with low income and/or high needs, the merger of income tax, National Insurance and capital gains tax into a single tax on incomes and the abolition of stamp duty, among other measures.
