= John Micklewright =

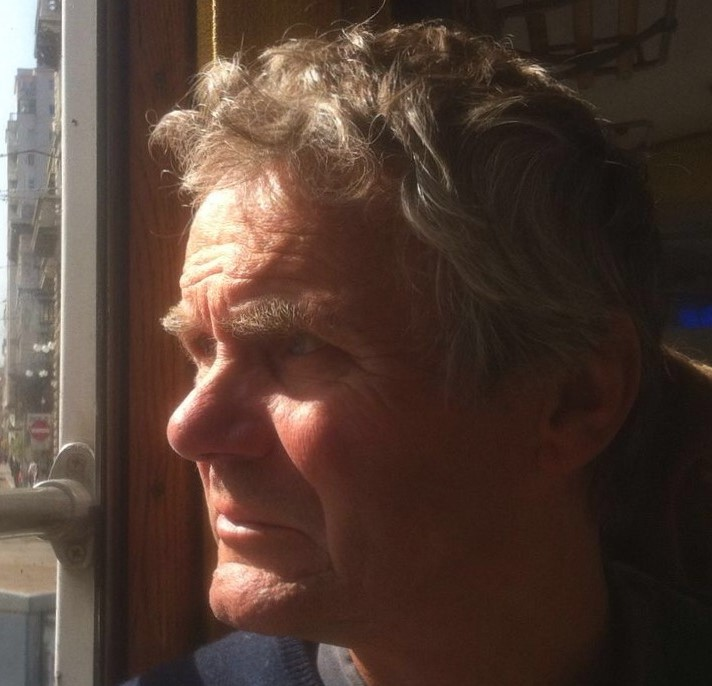
- Born: 20 June 1957 (age 69)

Academic background
- Education: London School of Economics
- Doctoral advisor: Tony Atkinson

John Micklewright (born 20 June 1957) is Professor Emeritus of Economics and Social Statistics at UCL Social Research Institute, University College London.

== Career ==
Micklewright studied at the University of Exeter (BA in Geography and Economics with First Class Honours) and then completed a PhD in Economics at the London School of Economics. He did post-doctoral work as a Prize Research Fellow at Nuffield College, Oxford. Before joining UCL, he was Professor of Social Statistics in the School of Social Sciences at the University of Southampton, head of research in the UNICEF Innocenti Research Centre, Professor of Economics at the European University Institute in Florence, and Lecturer, Reader and then Professor of Economics at Queen Mary, University of London.

He is the editor, together with Andrea Brandolini (Banca d'Italia), of Tony Atkinson's last book, published posthumously in 2019, Measuring Poverty around the World, Princeton University Press.

In 2015, he walked across France, from Normandy to the Alps, a journey described in a blog at the time ‘The Long March’ and subsequently in a book, The Opening Country: A Walk through France, Matador, 2021.

== Areas ==
His research focuses on:

1. poverty, inequality and the measurement of living standards
2. labour market flows and behaviour
3. educational achievement and segregation in schools
4. charitable giving, especially for development.
5. survey methods

At UNICEF Micklewright compared living standards of children in both OECD members and the countries of Central and Eastern Europe and the former USSR. He was one of the team that started the Innocenti Report Card series on child wellbeing in the OECD.

== Professional activities ==
He is a Research Fellow of the Institute for the Study of Labor (IZA), (Bonn).

== Publications ==
Micklewright's publications include the following books, as well as many journal articles:

- Unemployment Benefit and Unemployment Duration, STICERD Occasional Paper 6, LSE, 1985 (with A.B. Atkinson)
- Economic Transformation in Eastern Europe and the Distribution of Income, Cambridge University Press, 1992 (with A.B. Atkinson)
- Household Welfare in Central Asia, Macmillan, 1997 (edited with J. Falkingham, J. Klugman and S. Marnie)
- The Welfare of Europe’s Children: Are EU Member States Converging? The Policy Press, 2000 (with K. Stewart)
- The Dynamics of Child Poverty in Industrialised Countries, Cambridge University Press, 2001 (edited with B. Bradbury and S. Jenkins)
- Inequality and Poverty Re-Examined, Oxford University Press, 2007 (edited with S. Jenkins)
- The Great Recession and the Distribution of Household Income, Oxford University Press, 2012 (edited with S. Jenkins, A. Brandolini and B. Nolan)
- Family Background and University Success, Oxford University Press, 2016 (with C. Crawford, L. Dearden and A. Vignoles)
- The Opening Country: A Walk through France, Matador, 2021
