= Market distortion =

In neoclassical economics, a market distortion is any event in which a market reaches a market clearing price for an item that is substantially different from the price that a market would achieve while operating under conditions of perfect competition and state enforcement of legal contracts and the ownership of private property. In other words, a distortion is "any departure from the ideal of perfect competition that therefore interferes with economic agents maximizing social welfare when they maximize their own". A proportional wage-income tax, for instance, is distortionary, whereas a lump-sum tax is not. In a competitive equilibrium, a proportional wage income tax discourages work.

In perfect competition with no externalities, there is zero distortion at market equilibrium of supply and demand where price equals marginal cost for each firm and product. More generally, a measure of distortion is the deviation between the market price of a good and its marginal social cost, that is, the difference between the marginal rate of substitution in consumption and the marginal rate of transformation in production. Such a deviation may result from government regulation, monopoly tariffs and import quotas, which in theory may give rise to rent seeking. Other sources of distortions are uncorrected externalities, different tax rates on goods or income, inflation, and incomplete information. Each of these may lead to a net loss in social surplus. Market distortions are events, decisions, or interventions taken by governments, companies, or other agents, often in order to influence the market. They are often the response to market failures, i.e., circumstances that prevent perfect competition and achieving an optimal equilibrium in the market.

In the context of markets, "perfect competition" means:

- all participants have complete information,
- there are no entry or exit barriers to the market,
- there are no transaction costs or subsidies affecting the market,
- all firms have constant returns to scale, and
- all market participants are independent rational actors.

Many different kinds of events, actions, policies, or beliefs can bring about a market distortion. For example:

- almost all types of taxes and subsidies, but especially excise or ad valorem taxes/subsidies,
- asymmetric information or uncertainty among market participants,
- any policy or action that restricts information critical to the market,
- monopoly, oligopoly, or monopsony powers of market participants,
- criminal coercion or subversion of legal contracts,
- illiquidity of the market (lack of buyers, sellers, product, or money),
- collusion among market participants,
- mass non-rational behavior by market participants,
- price supports or subsidies,
- failure of government to provide a stable currency,
- failure of government to enforce the Rule of Law,
- failure of government to protect property rights,
- failure of government to regulate non-competitive market behavior,
- stifling or corrupt government regulation.
- nonconvex consumer preference sets
- market externalities
- natural factors that impede competition between firms, such as occurs in land markets

== See also ==
- Deadweight loss
- Excess burden of taxation
- Government failure
- Imperfect competition
- Land value tax
- Lump-sum tax
- Market failure
- Optimal tax
- Laffer Curve
- Welfare economics
