= Lump-sum tax =

Taxation on a lump-sum basis

A lump-sum tax is a special way of taxation, based on a fixed amount, rather than on the real circumstance of the taxed entity. In this, the entity cannot do anything to change their liability.

In contrast with a per unit tax, lump-sum tax does not increase in size as the output increases.

A lump-sum tax levied per-person is known as a "head-tax" or "poll-tax".

== Description ==
A lump-sum tax is one of the various modes used for taxation: income, things owned (property taxes), money spent (sales taxes), miscellaneous (excise taxes), etc. It is a regressive tax, such that the lower the income is, the higher the percentage of income applicable to the tax.

A lump-sum tax would be ideal for a hypothetical world where all individuals would be identical. Any other type of tax would only introduce distortions.

In the real world, lump-sum tax is not that easily applicable because many people believe that those who have higher ability to pay should pay higher taxes (progressive tax system) and if it were to happen, people with low income would have to be charged very high amounts of money relative to their income and that would be politically unacceptable.

For this reason, lump-sum taxation is rarely seen in real-world applications as it is so difficult to administer due to varying socioeconomic abilities and distributions of wealth. A tax that differs based on factors like ability or income would not be lump sum, and these are also factors that can be disguised or hidden. Nonetheless, lump-sum taxation still provides important theoretical background.

Lump-sum taxing can be often similar to personal property taxes on cars or business equipment or some condominium fees.

Lump-sum taxation is economically efficient in that it doesn't create "deadweight loss".

One example of a country still using lump-sum taxation system is Switzerland.

== Switzerland ==
Rich foreign nationals resident in Switzerland can be taxed on a lump-sum basis if they do not work in the country. Around 0.1% of taxpayers are taxed using lump-sum taxation – in 2018 that meant 4,557 people which paid in total CHF 821 million in tax.

This taxation is based on estimated living expenses, rather than on real income and assets. This means that there is no need for reporting effective global earnings and assets. However, this amount is calculated using the regular tax rates in Switzerland.

The full requirements for being eligible for lump-sum taxation are no Swiss citizenship, taking up residence in Switzerland and no gainful activity in Switzerland. In case of married couples, both people have to fulfil these requirements. The right to lump-sum taxation expires if a person takes up an employment in Switzerland or becomes a Swiss citizen.

Seen as unfair, lump-sum taxation has been abolished firstly in 2010 by the canton of Zurich shortly followed by the cantons of Schaffhausen, Appenzell Ausserrhoden, Basel Landschaft and Basel Stadt. Four other cantons (Thurgau, St Gallen, Lucerne, and Bern) decided to implement stricter rules for lump-sum taxation. However, a national abolition was rejected by referendum in 2014. At the end of 2016, 5,000 people were subject to lump-sum taxation in Switzerland.

== See also ==
- Distortions (economics)
- Excess burden of taxation
- Optimal tax

== Notes and references ==
- J. de V. Graaf (1987, 2008). "Lump sum taxes," The New Palgrave Dictionary of Economics, volume 3, pages 251-252.
