= Gareth Myles =

British academic economist

- Born: Manchester, England

Academic background
- Education: Nuffield College, Oxford

Gareth Myles is a British academic economist. He was born in Manchester and educated at the University of Warwick, the London School of Economics and Nuffield College, Oxford.
