= James Mirrlees =

British economist and Nobel Laureate (1936–2018)

Sir James Mirrlees FRSE FBA
- Born: 5 July 1936; Minnigaff, Scotland
- Died: 29 August 2018 (aged 82); Cambridge, England

Academic background
- Education: University of Edinburgh (MA); Trinity College, Cambridge (PhD)
- Doctoral advisor: Richard Stone

Academic work
- Discipline: Political economics
- Institutions: Chinese University of Hong Kong; Oxford University; University of Cambridge
- Doctoral students: Partha Dasgupta; Nicholas Stern; Peter J. Hammond; Franklin Allen; Barry Nalebuff; Geoffrey M. Heal; Huw Dixon; Anthony Venables; John Vickers; Alan Manning; Gareth Myles; Paul Seabright; Hyun-Song Shin; Zhang Weiying
- Notable ideas: Asymmetric information Moral Hazard; Optimal income taxation Zero population growth Spence–Mirrlees condition
- Awards: Nobel Memorial Prize in Economic Sciences (1996)
- Website: Information at IDEAS / RePEc

Sir James Alexander Mirrlees FRSE FBA (5 July 1936 – 29 August 2018) was a British economist and winner of the 1996 Nobel Memorial Prize in Economic Sciences. He was knighted in the 1997 Birthday Honours.

== Early life and education ==
Born in Minnigaff, Wigtownshire, Mirrlees was educated at Douglas Ewart High School, then at the University of Edinburgh (MA in Mathematics and Natural Philosophy in 1957) and Trinity College, Cambridge (Mathematical Tripos and PhD in 1963 with thesis title Optimum Planning for a Dynamic Economy, supervised by Richard Stone). He was a very active student debater. A contemporary, Quentin Skinner, has suggested that Mirrlees was a member of the Cambridge Apostles along with fellow Nobel Laureate Amartya Sen during the period.

== Economics ==
Between 1968 and 1976, Mirrlees was a visiting professor at the Massachusetts Institute of Technology three times. He was also a visiting professor at the University of California, Berkeley (1986) and Yale University (1989). He taught at both Oxford University (as Edgeworth Professor of Economics 1968–1995) and University of Cambridge (1963–1968 and 1995–2018).

During his time at Oxford, he published papers on economic models for which he would eventually be awarded his Nobel Prize. The papers centred on asymmetric information, which determines the extent to which they should affect the optimal rate of saving in an economy. Among other results, he demonstrated the principles of "moral hazard" and "optimal income taxation" discussed in the books of William Vickrey. The methodology has since become the standard in the field.

Mirrlees and Vickrey shared the 1996 Nobel Memorial Prize in Economic Sciences "for their fundamental contributions to the economic theory of incentives under asymmetric information".

Mirrlees was also co-creator, with MIT Professor Peter A. Diamond, of the Diamond–Mirrlees efficiency theorem, which was developed in 1971.

Mirrlees was emeritus Professor of Political Economy at the University of Cambridge and a Fellow of Trinity College, Cambridge. He spent several months a year at the University of Melbourne, Australia. He was the Distinguished Professor-at-Large of the Chinese University of Hong Kong as well as University of Macau.

In 2009, he was appointed Founding Master of the Morningside College of the Chinese University of Hong Kong.

Mirrlees was a member of Scotland's Council of Economic Advisers. He also led the Mirrlees Review, a review of the UK tax system by the Institute for Fiscal Studies.

His PhD students included eminent academics and policymakers like professor Franklin Allen, Sir Partha Dasgupta, professor Huw Dixon, professor Hyun-Song Shin, Lord Nicholas Stern, professor Anthony Venables, Sir John Vickers, and professor Zhang Weiying. He died in Cambridge, England, on 29 August 2018.

== Personal life ==
Mirrlees became an atheist.

== Publications ==
- "A New Model of Economic Growth"(with N. Kaldor), RES, 1962
- "Optimum Growth When Technology is Changing", RES, 1967
- "The Dynamic Nonsubstitution Theorem", RES, 1969
- "The Evaluation of National Income in an Imperfect Economy", Pakistan Development Review, 1969
- Manual of Industrial Project Analysis in Developing Countries, Vol II: Social Cost Benefit Analysis (with I.M.D. Little), 1969
- "An Exploration in the Theory of Optimum Income Taxation", RES, 1971 Archived 2 April 2022 at the Wayback Machine
- "Optimal Taxation and Public Production I: Production Efficiency" (with P.A. Diamond), AER, 1971
- "Optimal Taxation and Public Production II: Tax Rules"(with P.A. Diamond),AER, 1971
- "The Terms of Trade: Pearson on Trade, Debt, and Liquidity", in The Widening Gap (ed. Barbara Ward), 1971)
- "On Producer Taxation", RES, 1972
- "Further Reflections on Project Analysis" (with I.M.D. Little), Development and Planning. Essays for Paul Rosenstein-Rodan (eds. Bhagwati and Eckaus, 1972
- "Fairly Good Plans" (with N.H. Stern), Journal of Economic Theory, 1972
- "Aggregate Production with Consumption Externalities" (with P.A. Diamond), QJE, 1973
- "The Optimum Town", Swedish Journal of Economics, 1972
- "Population Policy and the Taxation of Family Size", Journal of Public Economics, 1972
- "Agreeable Plans" (with P.J. Hammond) and "Models of Economic Growth" (introduction), in Models of Economic Growth (ed. Mirrlees and Stern), 1973
- Project Appraisal and Planning for Developing Countries (with I.M.D. Little), 1974
- "Optimal Accumulation under Uncertainty: the Case of Stationary Returns to Investment", in Allocation under Uncertainty (ed. J. Dreze), 1974
- "Notes on Welfare Economics, Information and Uncertainty", in Essays in Equilibrium Behavior under Uncertainty (eds. M. Balch, D. McFadden, and S. Wu), 1974
- "Optimal Taxation in a Two-Class Economy", Journal of Public Economics, 1975
- "Optimum Saving with Economies of Scale" (with A.K. Dixit and N.H. Stern), RES, 1975
- "A Pure Theory of Underdeveloped Economies, using a Relationship between Consumption and Productivity", in Agriculture in Development Theory (ed. L. Reynolds), 1975
- "The Desirability of Natural Resource Depletion" (with J.A. Kay), in The Economics of Natural Resource Depletion (ed. D.W. Pearce), 1975
- "The Optimal Structure of Incentives and Authority within an Organization", Bell Journal of Economics and Management Science, 1976
- "On the Assignment of Liability: the Uniform Case" (with P.A. Diamond), Bell Journal of Economics, 1975
- "Private Constant Returns and Public Shadow Prices"(with P.A. Diamond), RES, 1976
- "Optimal Tax Theory: A Synthesis", Journal of Public Economics, December 1976
- "Implications for Tax Rates", in Taxation and Incentives, 1976
- "Arguments for Public Expenditure" in Contemporary Economic Analysis (eds. Artis and Nobay), 1979
- "Social Benefit-Cost Analysis and the Distribution of Income", World Development, 1978
- "A Model of Optimal Social Insurance with Variable Retirement" (with P.A. Diamond), Journal of Public Economics, 1978
- "Optimal Taxation in a Stochastic Economy: A Cobb-Douglas Example" (with P.A. Diamond and J. Helms), Journal of Public Economics, 1980
- "Optimal Foreign-income taxation", Journal of Public Economics, 1982
- "The economic uses of utilitarianism", in Sen, Amartya; Williams, Bernard, eds. (1982). Utilitarianism and beyond. Cambridge: Cambridge University Press. pp. 63–84. ISBN 978-0511611964.
- "The Theory of Optimum Taxation", Handbook of Mathematical Economics (eds. Arrow and Intriligator), Vol. III, 1985
- "Insurance Aspects of Pensions" (with P.A. Diamond), in Pensions, Labor and Individual Choice (ed. David A. Wise), 1985
- "Payroll-tax financed social insurance with variable retirement" (with P. A. Diamond), Scandinavian Journal of Economics, 1986
- "Taxing Uncertain Incomes", Oxford Economic Papers, 1990
- "Project Appraisal and Planning Twenty Years On" (with I.M.D. Little), in Proceedings of the World Bank Annual Conference on Development Economics 1990 (eds. Stanley Fischer, Dennis de Tray and Shekhar Shah), 1991
- "Optimal Taxation of Identical Consumers when markets are incomplete" (with P.A. Diamond), in Economic Analysis of Markets and Games (ed. Dasgupta, Gale, Hart and Maskin), 1992
- "Optimal Taxation and Government Finance" in Modern Public Finance (eds. Quigley and Smolensky), 1994
- "Welfare Economics and Economies of Scale", Japanese Economic Review, 1995
- "Private Risk and Public Action: The Economies of the Welfare State", European Economic Review, 1995
- "Tax by Design: the Mirrlees Review" Archived 19 June 2021 at the Wayback Machine, J. Mirrlees, S. Adam, T. Besley, R. Blundell, S. Bond, R. Chote, M. Gammie, P. Johnson, G. Myles and J. Poterba, ISBN 978-0199553747, Oxford University Press: 2011.

Awards
Preceded by Robert E. Lucas Jr.	Laureate of the Nobel Memorial Prize in Economics; 1996; Served alongside: William Vickrey	Succeeded by Robert C. Merton; Myron S. Scholes
