= Optimal tax =

Design and implementation of tax policy maximizing social welfare

Optimal tax theory or the theory of optimal taxation is the study of designing and implementing a tax that maximises a social welfare function subject to economic constraints. The social welfare function used is typically a function of individuals' utilities, most commonly some form of utilitarian function, so the tax system is chosen to maximise the aggregate of individual utilities. Tax revenue is required to fund the provision of public goods and other government services, as well as for redistribution from rich to poor individuals. However, most taxes distort individual behavior, because the activity that is taxed becomes relatively less desirable; for instance, taxes on labour income reduce the incentive to work. The optimization problem involves minimizing the distortions caused by taxation, while achieving desired levels of redistribution and revenue. Some taxes are thought to be less distorting, such as lump-sum taxes (where individuals cannot change their behaviour to reduce their tax burden) and Pigouvian taxes, where the market consumption of a good is inefficient, and a tax brings consumption closer to the efficient level.

In the Wealth of Nations, Adam Smith observed that

“Good taxes meet four major criteria. They are (1) proportionate to incomes or abilities to pay (2) certain rather than arbitrary (3) payable at times and in ways convenient to the taxpayers and (4) cheap to administer and collect.”

== Tax revenue ==
Generating a sufficient amount of revenue to finance government is arguably the most important purpose of the tax system. Optimal taxation theory attempts to derive the system of taxation that will achieve the desired revenue and income distribution with the least inefficiency—that is, that interferes least with market participants making Pareto optimal exchanges—economic transactions that make both parties better off.

Free Market economies use prices to allocate resources to produce the products society wants most. If demand exceeds supply, the price will rise as those who want the product most compete to buy it. The high price induces producers to make more, until supply is adequate to meet demand and the price comes down. If supply exceeds demand, the price falls as producers try to induce more people to buy the product. The low prices then induce producers to make something else, that consumers want more.

If the government imposes a tax however, the price the consumer pays is different from the price the producer receives because the government takes its cut. If demand is inelastic—if consumers will pay what they must to get the product at any price, consumers will pay the tax and government will appropriate some of their benefit from the transaction (and hopefully provide useful services like public education in exchange). If supply is inelastic—producers will sell the same amount regardless of price—producers will pay the tax and government will take some of their benefit from the transaction. Note that it does not matter which side actually writes the government's check, the market price will adjust to compensate (see Tax incidence).

However, if both supply and demand are elastic—producers will make less at a lower price and consumers will buy less at a higher price—then the equilibrium quantity will decrease. There may be a consumer willing to buy at a price for which a producer is willing to sell, but this Pareto optimal transaction does not occur because neither is willing to pay the government's cut. The consumer then buys something less desirable and the producer makes something less profitable (or simply produces less and enjoys more leisure), so that the economy is no longer producing the optimal mix of products. Moreover, the sale does not occur, so the government never collects the revenue that was the whole reason for the distortion. This is the deadweight loss—the government has not merely taken a cut of the benefits from the exchange, it has destroyed those benefits for all three. These are the results optimal tax theorists seek to avoid.

=== Horizontal and vertical equity ===
Another criterion for an optimal tax is that it should be equitable. Equity in the context of taxation demands that the tax burden should be proportional to the taxpayer's ability to pay. This criterion can be further broken down into horizontal equity (imposing the same tax on two taxpayers with equal ability to pay) and vertical equity (imposing greater tax burdens on those with greater ability to pay). Of course, opinions may differ as to whether two taxpayers, in fact, have equal ability to pay, and on how quickly the tax burden should rise with ability to pay (that is, how progressive the tax code should be).

Of the hundreds of provisions in the US tax code, for example, only a handful actually impose a tax (26 USC Sections 1, 11, 55, 881, 882, 3301, and 3311 are the primary examples). Instead, most of those provisions help to define how much income a taxpayer has—that is, their ability to pay. Even after the code has answered all the technical questions and determined a taxpayer's taxable income, normative questions remain as to whether they have the same ability to pay. For example, the US tax code (26 U.S.C. Section 1(a)-(d)) imposes less tax on couples filing joint returns and on heads of households than it does on taxpayers that are single, and provides a credit reducing the tax bills of those supporting children (26 U.S.C. Section 24). This can be seen as an attempt at horizontal equity, reflecting a judgement that taxpayers supporting families have less ability to pay than taxpayers with the same income but no dependents.

Vertical equity raises an additional normative question: once we have agreed which taxpayers have the same ability to pay and which taxpayers have more, how much more should those with greater ability to pay be made to contribute? While that question has no definitive answer, tax policy must balance competing goals such as revenue raising, redistribution, and efficiency.

However, as with almost any tax, implementing higher taxes will negatively affect incentives and alter an individual's behavior. In his article "Effects of Taxes on Economic Behavior," Martin Feldstein discusses how economic behavior determined by taxes is important for estimating revenue, calculating efficiency and understanding the negative externalities in the short run. In his article, like much of his research on this topic, he chooses to focus primarily on how households are affected. Feldstein recognizes that high taxes deter people from actively engaging in the market, causing a lower production rate as well as a deadweight loss. Yet, because it is difficult to see tangible results of deadweight loss, policy makers largely ignore it.

Some economists argue that taxes on consumption are always more efficient than taxes on income, because the latter have a greater disincentive effect. One issue with this analysis is defining what constitutes consumption and what constitutes investment. For lower-income working people, who spend most of their income, taxes on consumption also have a significant disincentive effect; while higher-income people may be motivated more by prestige and professional achievement than by after-tax income. Any gain in economic efficiency from shifting taxes to consumption may be quite small, while the adverse effects on income distribution may be large.

=== Lump-sum taxes ===
One type of tax that does not create a large excess burden is the lump-sum tax. A lump-sum tax is a fixed tax that must be paid by everyone and the amount a person is taxed remains constant regardless of income or owned assets. It does not create excess burden because these taxes do not alter economic decisions. Because the tax remains constant, an individual's incentives and a firm's incentives will not fluctuate, as opposed to a graduated income tax that taxes people more for earning more.

Lump-sum taxes can be either progressive or regressive, depending on what the lump sum is being applied to. A tax placed on car tags would be regressive because it would be the same for everyone regardless of the type of car the owner purchased and, at least in the United States, even the poor own cars. People earning lower incomes would then pay more as a percentage of their income than higher-income earners. A tax on the unimproved aspects of land tends to be a progressive tax, since the wealthier one is, the more land one tends to own and the poor typically do not own any land at all.

Lump-sum taxes are not politically expedient because they sometimes require a complete overhaul of the tax system. Lump-sum taxes are also unpopular when they are assessed per capita because they are regressive and make no allowance for a citizen's ability to pay.

A one-off, unexpected lump-sum levy which is proportional to wealth or income is also non-distorting. In this case, although wealth or income is penalised, the unexpected nature of the tax means that there is no disincentive to asset accumulation- as by definition those accumulating such assets are unaware that a portion of those assets will be taxed in the future.

== Commodity taxes ==
Frank P. Ramsey (1927) developed a theory for optimal commodity sales taxes in his article "A Contribution to the Theory of Taxation". The problem is closely linked to the problem of socially optimal monopolistic pricing when profits are constrained to be positive, known as the Ramsey problem. He was the first to make a significant contribution to the theory of optimal taxation from an economic standpoint, and much of the literature that has followed reflects Ramsey's initial observations.

He wanted to confront the problem of how to adjust consumption tax rates, under specified constraints, so that the reduction of utility is at a minimum. In an attempt to reduce excess burden of consumption taxes, Ramsey proposed a theoretical solution that consumption tax on each good should be "proportional to the sum of the reciprocals of its supply and demand elasticities". However, practically, it is problematic to constrain social planners to one form of taxation. It is better to enable them to consider all possible tax structures.

Using Ramsey's rule as a basis for their papers, Peter Diamond and James Mirrlees propose an alternative to Ramsey's proposition by allowing the planner to consider numerous tax systems, and their model has prevailed in taxation theories. In their first paper, "Optimal Taxation and Public Production I: Production Efficiency" Diamond and Mirrlees consider the problem of imperfect information exchanged between taxpayers and the social planner. According to their argument, an individual's ability to earn income differs. Though the planner can observe income, they cannot directly observe the individual's ability or effort to earn income, so that if the planner attempts to increase taxes on those with high ability to earn an income, the individual's incentives to earn a high-income decrease. They confront the government tradeoff between equality and efficiency that when higher taxes are imposed on those with the potential to earn higher wages, they are not incentivized to expend the extra effort to earn a greater income. They rely on what has been labeled the revelation principle where planners must implement a tax system that provides proper incentives for people to reveal their true wage-earning abilities.

They continued this idea in the second installment of their paper "Optimal Taxation and Public Production II: Tax Rules", where they discuss marginal tax rate schedules for labor income. If the policy maker implemented a tax increase in the marginal tax rate at a lower income, it discourages the individuals at that income from working hard. However, this same increase for high-income individuals does not distort their incentives because though it raises their average tax rate, their marginal tax rate remains the same. For example, giving $100 is worth more to a low-income earner than to a high-income earner. Diamond and Mirrlees came to the conclusion that the marginal tax rate for the top earner should be equal to zero and the optimal rate must be between zero and one. This provides the correct incentives for individuals to work at their optimal level.

== Developments in tax theory ==
William J. Baumol and David F. Bradford in their article "Optimal Departures from Marginal Cost Pricing" also discuss the price distortion taxes cause. They examine the proposition that in order to reach the optimal point of allocating resources, prices that deviate from marginal cost are required. They recognize that with every tax, there is some sort of price distortion, so they state that any solution can only be the second-best option and any solution proposed is under that added constraint. However, their theory differs from other literature in this topic. First, it deals with quasi-optimal pricing, looking at four options for Pareto optimality with adjusted commodity prices. Second, they express their theory in more simplified terms which incurs a loss of realistic application. Third, it combines the three discussions: the welfare theory, the contributions of the regulations and public finance. They conclude that under constraints, the best possible theory to get close to optimality, which is not “best” at all, is the systematic division between prices and marginal costs.

In his article entitled "Optimal Taxation in Theory", Gregory Mankiw reviews that current literature in theories on optimal taxation and analyzes the change in the tax theory over the past few decades. Like Diamond and Mirrlees, Mankiw recognizes the flaw in Ramsey's model that planners can raise revenue through taxes only on commodities but also points out the weakness of Mirrlees's proposition. Mankiw argues that Diamond's and Mirrlees's theory is extremely complex because of how difficult it is to keep track of individuals producing at their maximum levels.

Mankiw provides a summary of eight lessons that represent the current thought in optimal taxation literature. They include, first, the idea considering horizontal and vertical equity, that social planners should base optimal tax schedules on income rates for labour, which marks the equality and efficiency trade-off. Second, the more income an individual makes, their marginal tax schedule could actually decrease because they are discouraged from working at their optimal production level. The solution is to, after individuals reach a certain income level, ensure that the marginal tax remains steady. Third, reaching an optimal tax level could mean flat taxes. Fourth, the increase in wage inequality is directly proportionate to the extent of income redistribution as revenue is distributed to low-income earners. Fifth, taxes should not only depend on income amounts, but also on personal characteristics such as a person's wage-earning capabilities. Sixth, goods produced should only be taxed as a final good and should be taxed uniformly, which leads to their seventh point that capital should also not be taxed because it is considered an input of production. Finally, policymakers should consider individuals’ income histories, which require reliance on different types of taxation to derive optimal taxation. Mankiw identifies that the tax policy has largely followed the theories laid out in tax literature because social planners believe that the flatter the tax, the better, there are declining top marginal rates in OECD countries and taxes on commodities are now uniform and usually only final goods are taxed.

Joel Slemrod in his paper "Optimal Taxation and Optimal Tax System", argues that optimal tax theory, as it stood when Slemrod wrote this paper, was an insufficient guide to determine tax policies because policymakers had yet to find a way to implement a tax system that enticed individuals to work at their optimal level. As a solution, Slemrod proposes the theory of optimal tax systems a phrase he uses to refer to the normative theory of taxation. Slemrod advocates this theory because not only does it take into account the preferences of individuals, but also the technology involved in tax collecting. A practical application of this, for example, is implementing value-added taxes, a tax on the purchase price of a good or service, to correct tax evasion. He argues that any future tax literature in normative theory needs to focus less on consumer preferences and more on tax-collecting technology and the areas of the economy that affect tax collection.

Globalisation has also taken an important role in the development of taxes and tax systems. As referred previously, taxes have the purpose of fixing economic disparities among individuals, and that assortment of living standards and income generates competitiveness, especially among countries. The globalisation process has created new rules for companies and citizens to move across borders and, therefore, the tax systems they shall oblige to. Consequently, countries compete with each other on the taxation programme offered to both singular individuals and corporations, with the aim of becoming attractive to foreign agents, and simultaneously breed tax revenues to fund the government’s budget. Regarding the government’s budget and its strategy, it can also be a factor of attractiveness. Generally, countries with higher tax levels have also a tax structure tax differs from other countries, which can be related to the share of the government's expenditure that is invested in the population. For example, Sweden has one of the highest tax revenues (% of GDP), but invests almost 16% of the government expenditure in education. According to an OECD report, multiple countries have been changing their tax policies, being the normal procedure to cut the tax rate and broaden the tax base, which improves efficiency. From the same report, some situations were pointed out regarding the importance of the choice of tax policies, such as the imposition of taxes on products and services and the way these are perceived when exported, and the progressiveness of the taxes that can affect the inflow of economic agents (especially high-income ones). Initially, the last point was almost always directed to firms, but nowadays more high skilled workers are concerned with the subject; as opposed to low-skilled workers that are less affected by globalisation since the tax bases are not so flexible. Some studies show that there is a positive correlation between globalisation and capital taxes but, at the same time, that governments decrease the corporate taxes because of the globalisation phenomenon. It may sound somewhat paradoxical, but the change in the tax rates makes individuals more aware of the tariffs that are practised in other countries, contributing then for the globalisation.

== Income taxes ==
Another aspect of optimal taxation is determining income taxes, which can be regressive, flat, or progressive.

=== Labor income tax ===
The theory of optimal income tax on individual labor aims to find the optimal trade-off between the following three effects of increasing taxation:

- The mechanical effect - an increase in tax-rate increases the government revenue, if no individuals changed their behaviour in response.
- The behavioural effect - an increase in tax-rate discourages labour supply, and this leads to lower tax revenue as a result.
- The welfare effect - an increase in tax-rate reduces the individual utility, and thus reduces social welfare.

=== Corporate income tax ===
Arnold Harberger researched optimal taxation for corporations. Corporation income taxes are based on corporate profits. In the Journal of Political Economy, in an article "The Incidence of the Corporation Income Tax" Harberger provided a theoretical framework to understand the effects of corporate income taxes and to determine the impact of such taxes in the United States. He proposed a general-equilibrium model, in which he analyzed a two-sector economy (one corporate and the other not). In this model, Harberger concluded that the market will move toward a long-run equilibrium in which the after tax rate of return of all corporations would equalize, compensating for any impact of corporate income taxes. Thus, taxing profits would lower the overall rate of return and therefore the level of investment and output in the economy. Furthermore, he claimed that this model could apply to a broader range of conditions.

Martin Feldstein disputed Harberger's assumptions. Feldstein argues that one of Harberger's shortcomings is that policy makers typically focused on the effects on personal income tax. Feldstein argued that policy makers should analyze corporate and personal taxation separately. He presented a method on how to reflect the net effect of the changes to corporate tax rates on individual tax returns by focusing on the difference between real and nominal capital income. Feldstein noted the shortcomings of his model because of the lack of data to properly compare the two.

William Fox and LeAnn Luna proposed another theory in a joint article “State Corporate Tax Revenue Trends: Causes and Possible Solutions", in which they take on the role of this taxation. They purport to determine the effects on revenue and propose some ways to reverse the trend. They claim that because the effective corporate income tax rate fell by one-third over two decades, the effective tax rate decline was the result of a tax base that is eroding in relation to income and profits. This was because legislation narrowed the tax base.

One option to reduce the negative investment effect of corporate taxes on the level of private investment (and hence increase investment) is the provision of an investment tax credit or accelerated depreciation. In these cases, the effective rate becomes a negative function of the reinvestment rate.

In recent years, the concept of a corporate tax system incorporating deductions for "normal" profits (where normal is defined in relation to the long-term interest rate and the risk premium) has gained attention as a tax system that could minimise these distortions without reducing total tax revenue. Such a taxation system would in effect levy a higher rate of tax on firms earning "superprofits" which will likely be unaffected even when taxed at a higher rate, as the post-tax return on capital is significantly higher than the threshold or "normal" level. Conversely, the effective tax rate on marginal projects (with returns closer to the "normal" level) will be reduced. One example of such a tax system is Australia's Minerals Resource Rent Tax.

When an investment tax credit or equity-based deduction is applied, the optimal effective rate of taxation is generally increased as the distortionary effect of a given level of taxation is diminished. If the unadjusted tax rate was optimal, the assumption is that the net marginal benefit of increased taxation is zero near the optimum rate (the marginal costs and benefits sum to zero). If the distortionary costs of capital taxation are then lowered by deductions or credits, then the net benefit of rate increases will become positive, implying the tax rate should be raised.

=== Sales tax ===
A third consideration for optimal taxation is sales tax, which is the additional price added to the base price of a paid by the consumer at the point when they purchase a good or service. Poterba in a second article called "Retail Price Reactions To Changes in State and Local Sales Taxes" tests the premise that sales taxes on the state and local level are fully shifted to the consumers. He examines clothing prices before and after World War II. He recognizes that monetary policy is important to determine the response of nominal prices under a national sales tax and points to possible differences in taxes applied at the local level as to taxes applied at a national level. Poterba finds evidence reinforcing the idea that sales taxes are fully forward shifted, which raises the consumer prices to match the tax increase. His study coincides with the original hypothesis that retail sales taxes are fully shifted to retail prices.

Donald Bruce, William Fox, and M. H. Tuttle also discuss tax revenues through sales tax in their article "Tax Base Elasticities: A Multi-State Analysis of Long-Run and Short-Run Dynamics". In this article, they look at how personal state revenues and sales tax bases elasticities change for the short and long term in an attempt to determine the difference between them. With this information, the authors believe that states can both enhance and customize their tax structures, which can be used for careful resource planning. They found that for state personal income tax bases as compared to sales taxes, the average long-term income elasticity is more than doubled and the short-term display disproportionate results higher than the long-term elasticities. The authors contend with the conventional literature by declaring that neither the personal income tax nor the sales tax is, at least, universally, the more volatile tax. Though, the authors concede that in certain situations, the sales tax is more volatile, and in the long term, personal income taxes are more elastic.

Furthermore, in understanding this argument, it must also be considered, as Alan Auerbach, Jagadeesh Gokhale, and Laurence Kotlikoff do in "Generational Accounting: A Meaningful Way to Evaluate Fiscal Policy", what the implications to optimal taxation are for future generations. They propose that generational accounting represents a new method for fiscal planning in the long-run, and that unlike the budget deficit, this generational accounting is not arbitrary. Instead, it is a remedy for how to approach the generation burden and effects of fiscal policy on a macroeconomic level. Ethically, it is a problem to have low taxes now, and therefore low revenue now, because it inevitably puts the burden of responsibility to pay for those expenditures on future generations. So through generational accounting, it is possible to analyze this and provide the necessary information for policy makers to change the policies needed to alter this trend. However, according to Auerbach, politicians are currently only relying on accounting and are not seeing the potential consequences that will ensue in future generations.

The incidence of sales taxes on commodities also results in distortion if say food prepared in restaurants is taxed but supermarket-bought food prepared at home is not taxed at purchase. If a taxpayer needs to buy food at fast food restaurants because he/she is not wealthy enough to purchase extra leisure time (by working less) he/she pays the tax although a more prosperous person who enjoys playing at being a home chef is taxed more lightly. This differential taxation of commodities may cause inefficiency (by discouraging work in the market in favor of work in the household).

=== Capital income tax ===
The theory of optimal capital income tax considers the capital income as future consumption. Thus, the taxation of capital income corresponds to a differentiated consumption tax on present and future consumption, and results in the distortion of individuals' saving and consumption behavior as individuals substitute the more heavily taxed future consumption with current consumption. Due to these distortions, zero taxation of capital income might be optimal, a result postulated by the Atkinson–Stiglitz theorem (1976) and the Chamley–Judd zero capital income tax result (1985/1986). In contrast, subsequent work on optimal capital income taxation has elucidated the assumptions underlying the theoretical optimality of a zero capital income tax and advanced diverse arguments for a positive (or negative) optimal capital tax.

== Capital taxes ==
Taxation of wealth or capital (i.e. stocks, assets) should not be confused with taxation of capital income or income from wealth (i.e. transfers, flows). Taxation of capital in any form: above all financial instruments, assets then property was proposed as most optimal by Thomas Piketty. His proposition consist of progressive taxation of capital up to 5% yearly. Gregory Papanikos showed that even proportional taxation of capital may be considered as optimal.

=== Land value taxation ===
One early propositions was to capture the full rental value of land. Political economist and social reformer Henry George most notably championed the idea of a land value tax in Progress and Poverty, as a levy on the value of unimproved or natural aspects of the land, primarily location; it disregards the improvements such as buildings and irrigation. Land value taxation has no deadweight loss because the input of production being taxed (land) is fixed in supply; it cannot hide, shrink in value, or flee to other jurisdictions when taxed.

Economic theory suggests that a pure land value tax which succeeds in avoiding taxation of improvements could actually have a negative deadweight loss (positive externality), due to productivity gains arising from efficient land use. The taxation of locational values encourages socially optimal development on land in highly valued areas, like cities, since it reduces the incentive to speculate in land prices by leaving potentially productive locations vacant or underused.

Despite its theoretical benefits, implementing land value taxes is difficult politically. However, land value tax is considered progressive, because the ownership of land values is more concentrated than other sources of revenue, such as personal income or spending. George argued that because land is the fruit of nature (not labor) and the value of location is created by the community, the revenue from land should belong to the community.

== See also ==
- Ad valorem tax
- Excess burden of taxation
- Fiscal illusion
- Hall-Rabushka flat tax
- Laffer curve
- List of countries by tax revenue
- Optimal tariff
- Pigovian tax
- Progressive tax
- Proportional tax
- Single tax
- Taxable income elasticity
- Tax equity
- Tax incidence
- Tax reform
- Tax shift
