= James M. Buchanan =

American economist and Nobel Laureate (1919–2013)

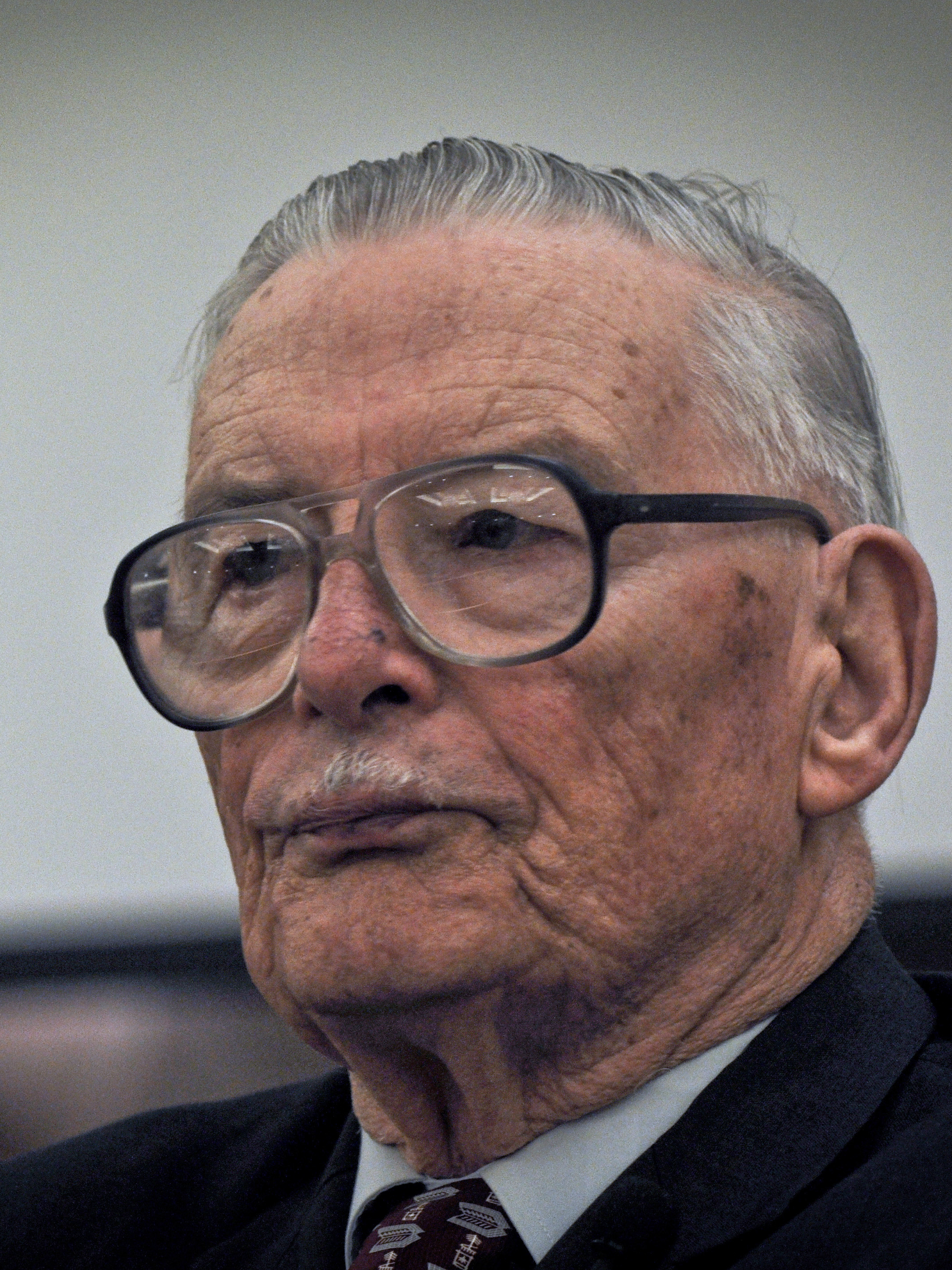
- Buchanan in 2010
- Born: James McGill Buchanan Jr. October 3, 1919; Murfreesboro, Tennessee, U.S.
- Died: January 9, 2013 (aged 93); Blacksburg, Virginia, U.S.
- Spouse: Anne Bakke (m. 1945)
- Parent(s): James Buchanan (father); Lila (Scott) Buchanan (mother)
- Relatives: John P. Buchanan (grandfather); James S. Buchanan (great-uncle); Gordon Anderson (fourth cousin once removed); Major John Buchanan (great-great-grandfather)

Academic background
- Education: Middle Tennessee State University (BS); University of Tennessee (MS); University of Chicago (PhD)
- Influences: Hobbes; Knight; Wicksell; Tullock; Hayek; Mises

Academic work
- Discipline: Public choice theory Constitutional economics
- School or tradition: Virginia School
- Institutions: George Mason University; Virginia Tech; University of Virginia
- Notable ideas: Public choice theory Logrolling; Benefit principle Club good Samaritan's dilemma
- Awards: Nobel Memorial Prize in Economic Sciences (1986)
- Website: Information at IDEAS / RePEc

James McGill Buchanan Jr. (/bjuːˈkænən/ bew-KAN-ən; October 3, 1919 – January 9, 2013) was an American economist known for his work on public choice theory originally outlined in his most famous work, The Calculus of Consent, co-authored with Gordon Tullock in 1962. He continued to develop the theory, eventually receiving the Nobel Memorial Prize in Economic Sciences in 1986.

Buchanan's work initiated research on how politicians' and bureaucrats' self-interest, utility maximization, and other non-wealth-maximizing considerations affect their decision-making. He was a member of the Board of Advisors of The Independent Institute as well as of the Institute of Economic Affairs, a member of the Mont Pelerin Society (MPS) and MPS president from 1984 to 1986, a Distinguished Senior Fellow of the Cato Institute, and professor at George Mason University.

== Early life and education ==
Buchanan was born in Murfreesboro, Tennessee, the eldest of the three children of Lila (née Scott) and James Buchanan. His paternal grandfather, John P. Buchanan, was governor of Tennessee from 1891 to 1893. He was a great-great-grandson of Major John Buchanan, an early Tennessee settler and the founder of Buchanan's Station; a grand-nephew of James S. Buchanan, former president of the University of Oklahoma; and a fourth cousin once removed of Gordon Anderson, the widower of screen star Sondra Locke.

According to Buchanan's 1992 memoir, when his father, James Buchanan Sr., married in 1918 and began his family he borrowed heavily to mechanize and improve the farm, including the acquisition of a herd of Jersey cattle. The Buchanan farm suffered during the 1920s—by the time James Buchanan Jr. was old enough to work on the farm, all the work was done either manually or with mules and horses. Buchanan described his life on the farm as "genteel poverty" with neither indoor plumbing nor electricity. The house did contain his grandfather's library of books on politics. Unlike in other farm families where children regularly stayed home to help as farm labor, his mother insisted he never miss a day of school. While completing his first university degree in 1940 at Middle Tennessee State Teachers College he continued to live at home and work on the farm. In 1941 he completed his M.S. at the University of Tennessee.

== World War II ==
Buchanan attended the United States Naval Reserve Midshipmen's School in New York starting in September 1941. He was assigned to Honolulu, Hawaii in March 1942, where he served as an officer on Admiral Chester W. Nimitz's operations planning staff in the United States Navy.

Buchanan attributed his dislike of what he considered "Eastern elites" to his six months of Navy officer training in New York in 1941. He believed that there was overt discrimination against young men from the South or West in favor of those who had attended what he called establishment universities in the Northeast. In a 2011 interview, Buchanan said that out of twenty "boys from the establishment universities, 12 or 13 were picked against a background of a total of 600 [men]." He was completing his last month of training in New York during the December 7, 1941 attack on Pearl Harbor. Buchanan said that "in balance" his work in operations planning during the war was "easy." He was discharged in November 1945.

== Education ==
With the support of his wife, Ann Bakke, and the generous G.I. Bill education subsidy available to war veterans, Buchanan applied to graduate school. In his 1992 autobiography, Buchanan said that when he began his graduate studies in 1945 at the University of Chicago, he was unaware of how market-oriented the Chicago school of economics was. He stated that he was essentially socialist until he enrolled in a course taught by Frank Knight. Knight, who also taught leading economic thinkers such as Milton Friedman and George Stigler at the University of Chicago, was a founding member of the Mont Pelerin Society. Within six weeks of starting his studies, Buchanan said he was "converted into a zealous advocate of the market order". Knight became Buchanan's "de facto" PhD supervisor, and his 1948 dissertation, "Fiscal Equity in a Federal State", was heavily influenced by Knight. Buchanan did not consider himself as belonging to the Austrian or the Chicago schools of economics. But he was a member of the Mont Pelerin Society, and served as its president from 1984 to 1986 just before he received the Nobel Memorial Prize in Economic Sciences. He did share many of their common beliefs. As Buchanan puts it: "I certainly have a great deal of affinity with Austrian economics and I have no objections to being called an Austrian. Friedrich Hayek and Ludwig von Mises might consider me an Austrian but, surely some of the others would not." Buchanan went on to say that: "I didn't become acquainted with Mises until I wrote an article on individual choice and voting in the market in 1954. After I had finished the first draft I went back to see what Mises had said in Human Action. I found out, amazingly, that he had come closer to saying what I was trying to say than anybody else."

It was also at Chicago that he first read and found enlightening the work of Swedish economist Knut Wicksell. Photographs of Knight and Wicksell hung on his office walls ever after.

== Academic career ==
After completing his PhD in 1948, Buchanan taught at the University of Tennessee as associate professor and later full professor from 1948 until 1951. He was a professor of economics at Florida State University from 1951 until 1956 and served for two years as the department chair. From 1955 to 1956 he was a Fulbright Scholar in Italy.

He taught at the University of Virginia from 1956 to 1968, UCLA from 1968 to 1969, and Virginia Tech from 1969 to 1983, where he held the title Distinguished Professor of Economics. In 1998, Buchanan returned to Virginia Tech as a Distinguished Emeritus Professor of Economics and Philosophy where he contributed in organizing and providing funds for workshops, symposium, and lectures, including the annual James M. Buchanan lectures.

In 1983 he became a professor at George Mason University where he remained until his retirement, after which he continued with emeritus status.

== Professional organizations ==
=== Thomas Jefferson Center for Studies in Political Economy ===
In 1956 Buchanan and G. Warren Nutter approached the president of the University of Virginia to discuss the creation of a new school within the university, "The Jefferson Center for Studies in Political Economy and Social Philosophy". Nutter, who studied under Friedman and Knight at the University of Chicago in the late 1940s, was working at that time under the sponsorship of the Brookings Institution's National Bureau of Economic Research (INBR) on his 1962 book The Growth of Industrial Production in the Soviet Union. It was Thomas Jefferson who founded the University of Virginia in 1819 in Charlottesville, Virginia as a public research university. The next year the school was founded with the intention of preserving a "social order built on individual liberty, and . . . as an educational undertaking in which students will be encouraged to view the organizational problems of society as a fusion of technical and philosophical issues."

One of the center's early publications that reached a wider audience was a 1959 report Buchanan co-authored with Nutter, "The Economics of Universal Education". In it they wrote that the, "case for universal education is self-evident: a democracy cannot function without an informed and educated citizenry. . . . If education is to be universal, compulsion must be exercised by government—that is, by the collective organ of society—since some parents might choose to keep their children out of school. For similar reasons, minimum standards of education must be determined by government. Otherwise, the requirement of education is empty and meaningless." Buchanan was not against "state participation in education" although he strongly opposed " state monopoly of education".

Its publication provided the center and its authors, their first opportunity to be involved in a major public policy issue related to constitutional reform. A March 12, 1959 Charlottesville Daily Progress editorial called for reform of Virginia's constitution that would recognize "both the need for universal education and the right of the individual to freedom of choice in the education of his children." Georgetown University historian, James H. Hershman, said the wording seems to be from "The Economics of Universal Education". In a 2017 CATO Institute's Libertarianism.org podcast, Richard E. Wagner, who studied under Buchanan in the 1960s and maintained a 50-year friendship with him, said that Buchanan was an "egalitarian" and had no objection to the 1954 Brown v. Board of Education U.S. Supreme Court decision that introduced desegregation in public schools. Wagner said that while Buchanan opposed segregated schools at the time, he also believed in decentralization and parental and student choice within a liberal orientation of people being able to develop their talents and abilities. Hershman wrote the Encyclopedia Virginia's "Massive Resistance" article,' and his 1978 PhD dissertation was on the massive resistance strategy—a Virginia state government strategy adopted in 1956 to block the desegregation of public schools led by Harry F. Byrd Sr., who coined the term. In a 2020 article, Hershman examined Buchanan's actions in the spring of 1959 within the context of the massive resistance policy. By the time Buchanan became involved, there was already a groundswell of protests against desegregation based on constitutional arguments, states' rights, and even some arguments from the Chicago school of economics. The Virginia school crisis offered Buchanan a "major opportunity" of promoting "libertarian economic and social ideas." The Buchanan and Nutter report proved most useful just before an April 16, 1959, public hearing on a proposed constitutional change. In order to counter the argument that a "private system was unfeasible and that any weakening of public education would damage the state's economy overall and discourage new industries from coming to Virginia", supporters asked Buchanan and Nutter to write a shorter summary of their February report. They published two articles on the report in the Richmond Times-Dispatch on April 12 and 13. While Buchanan's personal views on race were beside the point, according to Hershman, the "massive resistance private school initiative" had provided an "opportunity to "create a functioning alternative to the existing public system", to "promote his libertarian education doctrines, as an example to showcase those ideas". Hershman wrote that it did not seem to concern Buchanan that the libertarian doctrines would perpetuate segregation. Buchanan was on the wrong side of history. The school crisis brought in a power shift in the state of Virginia from a "rural, courthouse elite to that of an urban, business elite".

In later years, Buchanan no longer held the same ideas on school vouchers as those expressed in the 1959 report. He cautioned in a 1984 letter to the Institute for Economic Affairs' Arthur Seldon that a state-sponsored unregulated voucher system from tax revenues to avoid the "evils of state monopoly" of the education system, could have the unintended consequence of the "evils of race-class-cultural segregation." The voucher system could result in recreating the exclusive membership-only system for elites. While vouchers would ideally promote market competition while also providing benefits of "exposure to other races, classes and cultures", Buchanan warned that this may not happen in practice.

==== Public Choice Society and Public Choice journal ====
With the publication of The Calculus of Consent in 1962 and Mancur Olson's Logic of Collective Action in 1965, there was growing interest in public choice theory. Tullock and Buchanan applied for and received a National Science Foundation grant to organize a preliminary research meeting in Charlottesville in 1963 with about twenty people from economics, philosophy, and political science including Olson, William H. Riker, Vincent Ostrom, Anthony Downs, Duncan Black, Roland McKean, Jerome Rothenberg, and John Rawls (author of the influential 1971 A Theory of Justice). They created a Committee for the Study of Non-Market Decision Making, which later became the Public Choice Society. They wanted to focus on how choices and "decisions were made outside of a private market context". As a follow-up, they launched a journal with Tullock as editor called Papers on Non-market Decision Making. Tullock remained as editor until 1990. They had several follow-up meetings, including one in Chicago in 1967. Members were dissatisfied with the title and it was changed to Public Choice.

==== Virginia school of political economy ====
Buchanan remained at the University of Virginia until 1968. The work of Buchanan, Nutter, and other colleagues including Tullock, Stigler, Ronald Coase, Alexandre Kafka, and Leland B. Yeager later came to be seen as the start of the Virginia school of political economy as separate from the Chicago school of economics. Buchanan stated that Mancur Olson came up with the term some time after the Center for Study of Public Choice was founded at Virginia Tech. In a 1997 interview with Reason, Coase discussed the atmosphere in the university's economics department in the 1960s, in which he and Buchanan, Tullock, and Nutter felt that their work was considered to be "disreputable" and they were considered to be "right-wing extremists." Coase stated that he believed there was general suspicion towards anyone who supported an unregulated free market at that time.

=== Center for Study of Public Choice ===
In 1969, Buchanan, Tullock, and Charles J. Goetz established the Center for Study of Public Choice at Virginia Polytechnic Institute (VPI) in Blacksburg, Virginia with Buchanan as its first director.

In 1983, Buchanan relocated the entire Center for Study of Public Choice unit, which included its seven faculty members to George Mason University (GMU) in Fairfax, Virginia. Buchanan complained to then-GMU economics department chair Karen Vaughn that VPI was losing its status as unique center for public choice. Buchanan was offered an annual salary of over $100,000 at George Mason, At the time, George Mason was a relatively unknown state university, having just gained independent status from the University of Virginia in 1972. Buchanan was drawn to GMU's leadership. Vaughn stated that she believed the addition of the Center contributed to GMU's rapid growth. Over the next decades, GMU became the largest public university in Virginia.

Economist James C. Miller III, who served as chairman of the Federal Trade Commission (FTC) and as Budget Director for then-US president Ronald Reagan consulted with Buchanan, Tullock, and Tollison at the center. From 1998 to 2002 the Center functioned as part of James M. Buchanan Center for Political Economy.

=== Other activities and associations ===
Buchanan was associated with the Indianapolis-headquartered Liberty Fund, a free-market think tank which was founded in 1960 by Pierre F. Goodrich. Goodrich became a member of the Mont Pelerin Society in 1953 and had formed friendships with Hayek, Mises, Friedman and others. The Liberty Fund hosted conferences and symposiums on Buchanan's economic policy, liberalism and liberty. The entire collection of his publications are hosted on the Online Library of Liberty (OLL) site. The Liberty Fund also published The Collected Works of James Buchanan.

== Major research themes ==
Buchanan broad themes include public finance then public goods, public choice, and public philosophy. In the late 1940s and 1950s he investigated voting and other topics not usually studied in economics. Buchanan began to break from "disciplinary constraints" and examine problems from other disciplines such as political science.

In 1948, Buchanan first read the Swedish economist, Wicksell's Finanztheoretische Untersuchungen 1896 essay, "A New Principle of Just Taxation." He translated it from German and in his 1986 Nobel Prize lecture Buchanan said that Wicksell was an "important precursor of modern public-choice theory."had informed his own concept of unanimity-voting. Wicksell investigated a mechanism for voting how public goods could be financed in order to ensure that the tax burden was fairly distributed. (Note: Buchanan, James M; Tullock, Gordon (1962). The calculus of consent, logical foundations of constitutional democracy. Ann Arbor: University of Michigan Press. p. 361. ISBN 978-0472061006. OCLC 494115.) Wicksell applied the benefit principle to taxation. By using the mechanism of unanimity-voting, everyone involved would have a guarantee of receiving "benefits commensurate to their tax cost from any public good". Wicksell said that no would be able to complain if he were able to receive "a benefit which he himself considers to be (greater or at least) as great as the price he has to pay".

Buchanan said that his 1949 paper, "The Pure Theory of Government Finance: A Suggested Approach" published in the Journal of Political Economy he was influenced by Wicksell. to improve the rules and structure of politics, and particularly to recognize that politicians behave like most people, according to their own self-interests. It was a way of thinking about politics that was based on common sense reality, not romanticism. In that paper he called on economists to clarify their own assumptions about politics and to think about their political models before talking about "good taxation" and "good spending." "The Pure Theory of Government Finance: A Suggested Approach" published in the Journal of Political Economy It contained core ideas that Buchanan continued to develop over his career which spanned six decades, according to his biographer Richard E. Wagner. In his 1989 address on Buchanan's contributions, Tony Atkinson said that it "reads like a manifesto for his life's work." In it Buchanan clarified that the democratic state is not a single decision-making unit as in a monarchy. In democratic societies, the state can only represent the collective will of the sum of its individual members.

His 1950 article, "Federalism and Fiscal Equity"—reprinted in Richard A. Musgrave 1959 Readings in the economics of taxation—was described as a "pioneering" paper by Musgrave. During the recession of 1960–1961, Buchanan and Musgrave served on a Brookings Institution's National Bureau of Economic Research (NBER) advisory committee on the needs, sources, and utilization of public finances. Brookings is a respected think tank that has a long history of producing influential commissioned reports for the United States government. In their discussion on equity objectives of fiscal policy, Musgrave cited Buchanan's recommendation that the central fiscal policy should consider individuals, not the "states", as a matter of equity. The requirement of horizontal equity—the "principle that equals should be treated equally"— is more meaningful than that of vertical equity—the "requirement of differential treatment of unequals".

In 1955 Buchanan spent the year in Italy reading the works of the neoclassical economist Maffeo Pantaleoni (1857 –1924) and his followers—Antonio De Viti De Marco and Vilfredo Pareto—, who are part of the Italian school of public finance theory. They are considered to be a major influence on Buchanan's work. He considered them to be among the "intellectual forefathers of the modern public choice theory". In his Public Principles of Public Debt published in 1958, Buchanan acknowledged that "the Italian approach to the whole problem of public debt was instrumental in shaping my views". rigorous analysis of the theory of logrolling, macroeconomics, constitutional economics, and libertarian theory. He was the first anglophone economist to focus on this and included their work in his chapter, "The Italian Tradition in Fiscal Theory", in his 1960 textbook Fiscal Theory and Political Economy. He discussed collective decision-making in public finance—the role of the government in the state's economy and fiscal theory.

In the late 1940s and early 1950s as Buchanan was developing his own thoughts on the concept of the state, Kenneth Arrow published his influential 1951 monograph, Social Choice and Individual Values. which was the catalyst for debate on social choice. The monograph was based on ideas Arrow first developed in 1948 as a RAND Corporation intern and in his PhD dissertation in 1950 combining social ethics, voting theory and economics in his social choice theory. Arrow examined the role of individual preferences in the process of collective decision-making regarding aggregate or group preferences, for example, in voting and establishing underlying constitutions for the common good. Arrow concluded that it was generally impossible to assess the "common good", for example, the design of a social welfare function through a fair ranked voting electoral system because individual preferences within the aggregate differ. The paradox is the impossibility of majority voting yielding a stable result or pareto efficiency with existing rules of the game. Buchanan critiqued Arrow's impossibility theorem or Arrow's paradox. The thesis in Arrow's 1951 book that "majority rule would not give you a political equilibrium" created a lot of debate. Buchanan responded that his idea was anti-majoritaire—if that is what the preferences are, then in a democracy we ought to have a rotation, so there is not just one majority simply ruling. Most political scientists in the 1950s believed in majoritarian democracy as the ideal parliamentary model. Buchanan's ideal was more of a constitutional structure. Buchanan described himself as a constitutional political economist who writes from an economic point of view within a structure of American politics that aligns with James Madison's vision of the ideal democratic parliamentary model, which was not a majority democracy. In public choice theory, Buchanan raises concerns about minorities being exploited under permanent majorities

While in Italy on a Fulbright Scholarship in 1956 - 1957 he became aware of how his generation of Americans—those born in the decades after WWI—had a view of politics that was too romanticized. Italians took a more skeptical, realistic, and critical view of politics. When he returned to the US in 1956, he carried that skepticism with him. In 1958, Tullock took time off from his position at the U.S. Department of State that he had held since 1949, to do research at the University of Virginia focused on majority rule. Buchanan described Tullock as a natural realist about politics; his skepticism had increased in Washington.

Buchanan met Tullock, who had a law degree but no formal training in economics, when Tullock accepted a postdoctoral position at the University of Virginia in 1958. Although Tullock's PhD was in law and he had little formal training in economics, the two complemented each other; Buchanan as the philosopher and Tullock the scientist. Together, they set out to provide an "optimal set of the political rules of the game".

In 1962, Buchanan and Tullock published Calculus of Consent, Logical Foundations of Constitutional Democracy, in which they first outlined public choice theory. Buchanan said he was motivated to write The Calculus of Consent, because he had a sense that those who should know what democracy actually was, did not. He started to question taxation, expenditure decisions, budgets and the political process. In the same year Buchanan began drafts of his 1967 book, Public Finance in Democratic Process: Fiscal Institutions and the Individual Choice in which he applied ideas from pioneering ideas from the public choice school of analysis developed in Calculus of Consent to public finance. Buchanan received research support and assistance from the Brookings Institution for the book. In it he analyzed how individual behavior affected fiscal institutions in situations related to collective choice, for example, the relationship between income tax and the public use of economic resources. He said that the primary way in which individuals can make collective choices is by voting.

In 1967 Buchanan co-authored Public Debt in a Democratic Society with Wagner. Buchanan considered his work on public debt as an important extension of his work on public choice theory. Public choice theory examined political decision-making structures as applied to budget policy, specifically as related to fiscal deficit. Buchanan said that there was government overreach in totalitarian regimes but also in the 1960s in Western democratic welfare-state nations, such as President Lyndon B. Johnson's Great Society programs designed to eliminate poverty and racial injustice. As more people became critical of government programs during the 1970s, in his view public choice theory provided some common sense answers, as opposed to romance. He said that he did not want to "lead the way", he wanted to provide a way for people to "interpret better what they were seeing". He described how politicians provide their constituents with programs that benefit them, paying for the new programs with deficit to avoid having to raise taxes to pay for them in order to remain in office. Public choice policies called for constitutional amendments to prevent the deficit from accelerating even more. In his 1986 chapter "Budgetary Bias in Post-Keynesian Politics" in Deficits, he wrote, "The most elementary prediction from public choice theory is that in the absence of moral or constitutional constraints democracies will finance some share of public consumption from debt issue rather than from taxation and that, in consequence, spending rates will be higher than would accrue under budget balance."

In 1968, Buchanan left the University of Virginia and spent a year at the University of California, Los Angeles. He published The Demand and Supply of Public Goods, in which he described public finance methods using consensus politics developed by Wicksell and his student Erik Lindahl (1891 – 1960) within the framework of their concept of the ideal state. Hayek had introduced their work to anglophone economists in his 1941 Pure Theory of Capital written while he was at the London School of Economics (LSE). Buchanan traced the history of public goods theory to Wicksell and re-examined the Wicksellian unanimous solution in voting. He discussed tax shares as a variable in public finance theory and potential outcomes of public choice by majority rule. The Lindahl tax share on public goods paid by individuals is based on the marginal benefits derived from the goods—a system designed to maximize efficiency for the individual while also providing optimal public good. The rate or share of taxation is related to the willingness to pay. Buchanan discussed challenges to achieving a Pareto-optimal position from Lindahl's concept of public goods, such as free riders.

Buchanan's 1969 work Cost and Choice is often overlooked for its contributions in defining the parameters of opportunity cost. In it, he writes that the costs to individuals determine what the price of a good or service is. For example, the physical work that is required to hunt an animal as well as the price of the tools necessary to hunt it and the time spent hunting all play a factor in the price an individual places on the meat. The asking price of the meat will vary from person to person because the input costs required for each person are not the same.

In his 1964 article "What Should Economists Do?", which was based on his 1963 address to the Southern Economic Association (SEA), Buchanan distinguished between economics and politics. The former studies "the whole system of exchange relationships" while the latter studies "the whole system of coercive or potentially coercive relationships". One of Buchanan's definitive statements on the re-orientation of the two academic disciplines of economics and political science was found in this 1963 SEA address. Buchanan told his contemporaries in the field of economics that Adam Smith's statement in his 1776 An Inquiry Into the Nature and Causes of the Wealth of Nations that the human "propensity to truck, barter, and exchange one thing for another" is what political economy is all about. Economists should therefore focus on the politics of exchange not on attempting to engineer efficient allocations of resources.

Michael Munger described three elements of Buchanan's concept of public choice theory—behavioural symmetry, methodological individualism, and politics as exchange, or "politics without romance". In their article on Buchanan's politics as exchange, they described him as a classical liberal, who also incorporated rational choice theory, and individual utility maximization in his analyses. The ultimate exchange process is not based on some romantic notion of public service that Buchanan roundly rejected. "Politics of exchange implies a shared exchange relationship or enterprise that is crucial as a way of "justifying political coercion of one person over another". Buchanan encouraged individuals to be skeptical about bureaucrats' and politicians' motivations and behaviour. Buchanan said that the "politics as exchange" contract on which the constitution is based precedes any economic enterprise. Trade in goods and services can only be undertaken in an orderly fashion if a legal system in already in place, one that includes limits on the powers of governments. Politics of exchange can then be described as cooperative, the contract between "nonmarket institutions and the mechanism of coercion is collective". Politics as exchange is a way of justifying coercion by providing a means for a change that is mutually beneficial, attaining pareto efficiency through cooperation, where societal improvement is possible when a change results in harming no one but helping someone.

In his 1966 publication Public Finance in a Democratic Process Buchanan began to develop applications based on The Calculus of Consent using a multidisciplinary approach through the lens of both economics and politics .

Buchanan was largely responsible for the rebirth of political economy as a scholarly pursuit. He emphasized that public policy cannot be considered solely in terms of distribution, but is instead always a matter of setting the rules of the game that engender a pattern of exchange and distribution. His work in public choice theory is often interpreted as the quintessential instance of economics imperialism; however, Amartya Sen has argued that Buchanan should not be identified with economics imperialism, since he has done more than most to introduce ethics, legal political thinking, and indeed social thinking into economics. Crucial to understanding Buchanan's system of thought is the distinction he made between politics and policy. Politics is about the rules of the game, where policy is focused on strategies that players adopt within a given set of rules. "Questions about what are good rules of the game are in the domain of social philosophy, whereas questions about the strategies that players will adopt given those rules is the domain of economics, and it is the play between the rules (social philosophy) and the strategies (economics) that constitutes what Buchanan refers to as constitutional political economy".

In his 1975 book, The Limits of Liberty: Between Anarchy and Leviathan, which has been described as his magnum opus, Buchanan examined the concept of a social contract. In The Limits of Liberty Buchanan did support some redistribution; his proposed social contract of a "productive" state includes tax-financed goods and some social insurance. He felt this would have unanimous agreement. In the summer of 1975 at a Liberty Fund conference in Ohio with most of the economists in attendance saying there should be no estate tax, Buchanan passionately disagreed. He thought that there should be a 100% marginal tax on all estates over a relatively modest amount, to prevent an aristocracy from forming in America and to ensure equal opportunity.

Buchanan was a vocal critic of the 1994 David Card and Alan B. Krueger's minimum wage study. Contrary to the consensus at the time, they found that "the increase in the minimum wage increased employment." In a 1996 response in the Wall Street Journal, Buchanan wrote, "Just as no physicist would claim that "water runs uphill," no self-respecting economist would claim that increases in the minimum wage increase employment. [...] Fortunately, only a handful of economists are willing to throw over the teaching of two centuries; we have not yet become a bevy of camp-following whores."

=== Public choice theory ===
Buchanan is the chief architect and the leading researcher of public choice theory which was first outlined in his most well-known work, The Calculus of Consent. Over many decades, Buchanan developed the theoretical formulation which straddled both economics and political science and became known as "The New Political Economy" or "Public Choice" for which he was honored with the Nobel Prize in Economic Sciences. Tony Atkinson said that one of Buchanan's major contributions was clarifying two levels of public choice—the constitutional level which is where the rules of the game are set, and the postconstitutional level, where the game is played within the constitutional rules.

In The Calculus of Consent, Buchanan and Tullock cited Swedish economist Knut Wicksell's standpoint on public choice in their argument for the need for unanimous agreement on constitutional rules. Anthony Atkinson cited the Royal Swedish Academy of Sciences describing the significant role of Wicksell in the development of Buchanan's thinking. It was Buchanan who translated Wicksell's A New Principle of Just Taxation from German in 1958. Within the framework of public choice, they described the potential for logrolling as enhancing rather than reducing welfare. Logrolling refers to politicians' vote-trading on provisions as part of an endgame of achieving their political or economic goals.

According to a 1992 journal article by George Mason University economists, Alexander Tabarrok and Tyler Cowen, the precursor to Buchanan and Tullock's public choice theory is found in the work of John C. Calhoun. Tabarrok, who is the director of the Center for Study of Public Choice, and Cowen, Director of the Mercatus Center and a CSPC faculty member, said that Calhoun's political philosophy writings, as developed in his 1851 A Disquisition on Government, proposed the rule by unanimity to reform the constitution, which as it then existed according to Calhoun, had resulted in a form of democracy that did not sufficiently protect liberty. In his analysis of Calhoun's work through the Virginia political economy perspective, the Heartland Institute's Alexander Salter wrote that Buchanan's project regarding generality norm is supported by Calhoun's concurrent majority developed in the Disquisition.

In the Dictionary of Economics, Tullock said that public choice theory applies methodologies from economics to the study of political behavior. Public choice theory assumes that people are mainly guided by self-interest, including politicians, bureaucrats, and government officials. Public choice theory focuses on democratic decision-making process within the political realm. Buchanan used both fields of economics and political science to help develop his theory of public choice. The same principles used to interpret people's decisions in a market setting are applied to voting, lobbying, campaigning, and even candidates. Buchanan maintains that a person's first instinct is to make their decisions based upon their own self-interest, which varied from previous models where government officials acted in constituents' best interest. Buchanan explains public choice theory as "politics without romance" because, he says, many of the promises made in politics are intended to appear concerned with the interest of others, but in reality, are the products of selfish ulterior motives. According to this view, political decisions, on both sides of the voting booth, are rarely made with the intention of helping anyone but the one making the decision. Buchanan argues that the actions of voters and politicians can be predicted by analyzing their behaviors.

In the 1960s when Buchanan first began to formulate his public choice theory, he was one of the few, if not the only economist, who was critical of Keynesian economics, which had become widely accepted in the United States in the 1960s and resulted in a shift in towards governance through "macro-economic engineering". Keynes had written his classic and influential The General Theory of Employment, Interest and Money in 1938, but there was a lag between its publication and the widespread adoption of his ideas. By 1965, Time magazine featured the phase "We are all Keynesians now" on its cover attributing it to Milton Friedman. Keynes promoted the use of deficit spending as a way to implement government programs in the wake of the Great Depression in the 1930s and Post-World War II. The 1977 book, Democracy in Deficit, by Buchanan and co-author Richard Wagner was based on an analysis of Keynesian macroeconomic theory and policy in which they applied the basic tools of public choice theory for the first time. They found that there was a bias towards deficit spending that could be linked to the self-interest of the political agents involved.

=== Constitutionalism ===
Within constitutionalism, Buchanan worked on developing the field of constitutional economics. According to Buchanan, the ethic of constitutionalism is a key for constitutional order and "may be called the idealized Kantian world" where the individual "who is making the ordering, along with substantially all of his fellows, adopts the moral law as a general rule for behavior". Buchanan rejected "any organic conception of the state as superior in wisdom to the citizens of this state". This philosophical position forms the basis of constitutional economics. Buchanan believed that every constitution is created for at least several generations of citizens. Therefore, it must be able to balance the interests of the state, society, and the individual.

There was a long history of neoliberal economists in Chile even before Augusto Pinochet 1973 Chilean coup d'état that deposed President Salvador Allende. Through the 1970s and 1980s the Chilean economists known as the Chicago Boys who studied at the University of Chicago under Milton Friedman had applied his economic theories in their government positions in South America, including in the military dictatorship of Chile (1973–1990). The Political Constitution of the Republic of Chile of 1980 came into full force in March 1981 constitution, establishing a market-oriented model based on Chicago School and Friedman's neoliberal ideas. In Chile, Buchanan provided policy advice and his constitutional political economy arguments to Pinochet. He also allegedly provided an "analytical defense of military rule to a predominantly Chilean audience." Hayek also visited Chile and Pinochet that year.

== Views on Anarchy ==
=== Anarchy as a theoretical ideal ===
Buchanan had strong views on anarchy as a means of running society. Going so far as to say in his 1975 book The Limits of Liberty “The ideal society is anarchy, in which no man or group of men coerces any other.” (page 92). This paints a picture of Buchanan and what he believes, in a perfect world, no man should be forced to do anything. Grounded in reality, Buchanan also wrote, “Anarchy is the ideal for ideal men; for ordinary men, some government is necessary.” This gives credence to the idea that while anarchy sounds good in a vacuum, in real world applications there needs to be at least some kind of government control for the protection of society and its members. Scholars later debated between themselves on the validity of these ideas, and if Buchanan would be considered an anarchist or not. Some scholars, such as Peter Boettke and Rosolino Candela, made the case for Buchanan being closer to anarcho-capitalism than many other economists. The argument being that he treated anarchy as a moral idea over just a rhetorical trick. Other scholars such as Viktor Vanberg, and Roger Congleton, do not believe that Buchanan was truly an anarchist but said that he used it as a thought experiment, in order to put tight limits on government, but never calling for its full removal.

== Awards ==
- 1986: Nobel Memorial Prize in Economic Sciences for "development of the contractual and constitutional bases for the theory of economic and political decision making"
- 2001: Honorary doctoral degree from Universidad Francisco Marroquín, in Guatemala City, Guatemala, for contribution to economics.
- 2006 National Humanities Medal for his development of economic analysis of politics.

== Legacy ==
Middle Tennessee State University (MTSU) Honors College's Buchanan Fellowship program, named for Buchanan, is awarded to 20 first-year student at MTSU annually. The Buchanan Transfer Fellowship program is awarded to 30 transfer students each year. Additionally, MTSU's Buchanan Family Reading Room at the James E. Walker Library was funded with a gift by Buchanan's family to honor Buchanan and the contributions of the family as a whole to the state of Tennessee.

In his 2017 publication, Richard Wagner described how Buchanan's scholarship continues to influence law, ethics, political science, and economics in the 21st century.

Nicolás Cachanosky and Edward J. Lopez suggest that Buchanan's research can inform work on trade restrictions and populism in the twenty-first century.

Buchanan is a central figure in the 2017 nonfiction book Democracy in Chains by Duke University professor and historian Nancy MacLean. MacLean traced Buchanan's concept of power to the 1950s and 1960s. Buchanan had become concerned that the federal government was channeling too many resources to the public. As he witnessed the federal government increasing its power, Buchanan sought ways to protect the wealthy from being forced to support programs that seemed to him to be a move towards socialism. MacLean described how Buchanan and other libertarians seek to protect capitalism by preventing government overreach. MacLean described Buchanan's concept of human nature as "dismal" and that he believed that politicians and government workers are motivated by self-interest and that government would continue to increase in scale and power unless there were constitutional limits in place. MacLean raised concerns that Buchanan and Charles Koch mutually supported one another to the detriment of democratic participation for all. Koch provided millions in funding to libertarian university programs and Buchanan provided the intellectual arguments from political economy to place limits on democracy. MacLean's book became a catalyst for discussion online and in journals. The New York Review of Books, Boston Review of Books, and Los Angeles Review of Books gave the book positive reviews. Her critics include David Bernstein who wrote a series of Washington Post opinion pieces as part of the Volokh Conspiracy blog. In a 2018 Journal of Economic Literature review of MacLean's book, Jean-Baptiste Fleury and Alain Marciano said that MacLean misunderstood public choice theory and that she had overlooked some significant aspects of Buchanan's biography and thinking and had over-interpreted others. MacLean, who spent years studying Buchanan's copious archives after his death, says that the influence of Buchanan's six decades of work on modern conservatism is not well-enough appreciated or understood by liberal politicians, economists, and journalists.

== Personal life and death ==
Buchanan met Ann Bakke, who was of Norwegian descent, in Hawaii while they were both serving in the military during World War II. Bakke served with the Army Air Transport Command at Hickam Field as a secretary.

They married on October 5, 1945, in San Francisco. Ann died in 2005. They had no children.

In a 1986 Chicago Tribune interview Buchanan said, "I want a private sphere in which I am protected, where nobody can invade...I don't feel the need to be a part of a community or a team." According to a Washington Post obituarist he was not known for his warm personality, and that even his "staunchest admirers admitted that he was forbidding." Even though he had a long career at George Mason University in Fairfax, Buchanan and his wife chose to spend most of their time a four-hour drive away on their 400-acre working farm near Blacksburg. They had vegetable gardens and raised cattle.

Buchanan was an Atheist and antagonistic to religion.

Buchanan died at their farm on January 9, 2013, at age 93.

The New York Times obituary said that the Nobel Prize-winning economist who championed public choice theory influenced a "generation of conservative thinking about deficits, taxes and the size of government". The Badische Zeitung (Freiburg) called Buchanan, who showed how politicians undermine fair and simple tax systems, the "founder of the new political economy".

== Selected publications ==
- Politics of Bureaucracy by Gordon Tullock, foreword by James M. Buchanan (Washington: Public Affairs Press, 1965)
- Academia in Anarchy (with Nicos E. Devletoglou), 1970
- Democracy in Deficit (with Richard E. Wagner), 1977
- Freedom in Constitutional Contract, 1978
- The Power to Tax (with Geoffrey Brennan), 1980
- The Reason of Rules (with Geoffrey Brennan), 1985
- Liberty, Market and State, 1985
- Why I, Too, Am Not a Conservative: The Normative Vision of Classical Liberalism (Cheltenham UK: Edward Elgar), 2005

A listing of Buchanan's publications from 1949 to 1986 can be found at the Scandinavian Journal of Economics, 1987, 89(1), pp. 17–37.

== See also ==
- Social contract

== Works ==
Awards
Preceded by Franco Modigliani	Laureate of the Nobel Memorial Prize in Economics; 1986	Succeeded by Robert M. Solow
