= Politics =

Activities associated with group decisions

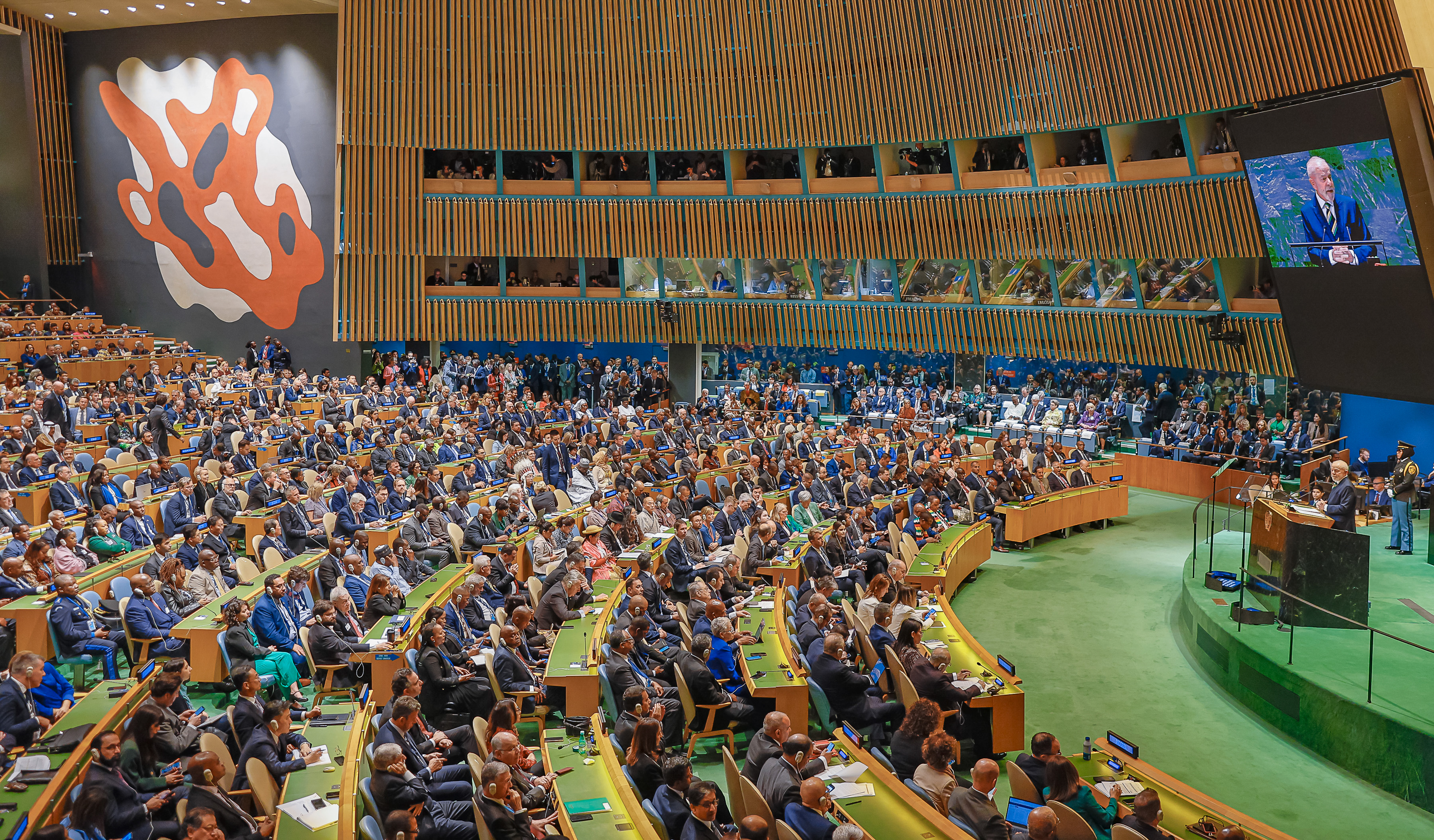
The opening of the 79th session of the United Nations General Assembly, 2024

Politics (Note: from Ancient Greek πολιτικά (politiká) 'affairs of the cities') is the activity of settling affairs in an organized society. Politics is usually concerned with resolving issues within a society via a government. Politicians are individuals engaged in the activity of politics. The branch of social science that studies politics and government is referred to as political science.

A variety of methods are deployed in politics, which include promoting one's own political views among people, negotiation with other political subjects, making laws, and exercising internal and external force, including warfare against adversaries. Politics is exercised on a wide range of social levels, from clans and tribes of traditional societies, through modern local governments, companies and institutions up to sovereign states, to the international level.

In modern states, people often form political parties to represent their ideas. Members of a party often agree to take the same position on many issues and agree to support the same changes to law and the same leaders. An election is usually a competition between different parties.

A political system is a framework which defines acceptable political methods within a society. The history of political thought can be traced back to early antiquity, with seminal works such as Plato's Republic, Aristotle's Politics, Confucius's political manuscripts and Chanakya's Arthashastra.

Politics may be used positively in the context of a "political solution" which is compromising and non-violent, or descriptively as "the art or science of government", but the word often also carries a negative connotation.

== Etymology ==
The English word politics has its roots in the Greek word polis (or poleis) which means "city". Aristotle's classic work, Politiká used the Ancient Greek term politiká (Πολιτικά, 'affairs of the cities'). In the mid-15th century, Aristotle's composition was rendered in Early Modern English as Polettiques [sic], (Note: "The book of Etiques and of Polettiques [sic]" (Bhuler 1961/1941:154).) which became Politics in Modern English.

The singular politic was first attested in English in 1430, coming from Middle French politique, meaning "of the state, political, of the regulation of social behavior" —itself derived from politicus, a Latinization of the Greek πολιτικός (politikos) from πολίτης (polites, 'citizen') and πόλις (polis, 'city'). This singular form has a variety of meanings, often used outside the realm of politics.

== Approaches ==
=== Extensive and limited ===
Adrian Leftwich has differentiated views of politics based on how extensive or limited their perception of what accounts as 'political' is. The extensive view sees politics as present across the sphere of human social relations, while the limited view restricts it to certain contexts. For example, in a more restrictive way, politics may be viewed as primarily about governance, while a feminist perspective could argue that sites which have been viewed traditionally as non-political, should indeed be viewed as political as well. This latter position is encapsulated in the slogan "the personal is political", which disputes the distinction between private and public issues. Politics may also be defined by the use of power, as has been argued by Robert A. Dahl.

=== Moralism and realism ===
Some perspectives on politics view it empirically as an exercise of power, while others see it as a social function with a normative basis. This distinction has sometimes been called the difference between political moralism and political realism. For moralists, politics is closely linked to ethics, and is at its extreme in utopian thinking. For example, according to Hannah Arendt, the view of Aristotle was that, "to be political…meant that everything was decided through words and persuasion and not through violence"; while according to Bernard Crick, "politics is the way in which free societies are governed. Politics is politics, and other forms of rule are something else." In contrast, for realists, who some include figures such as Niccolò Machiavelli, Thomas Hobbes, and Harold Lasswell, the true nature of politics reflects human desire for rule and the aggrandizement of self interests rather than moralism.

=== Conflict and co-operation ===
Agonism argues that politics essentially comes down to conflict between conflicting interests. Political scientist Elmer Schattschneider argued that "at the root of all politics is the universal language of conflict", while for Carl Schmitt the essence of politics is the distinction of 'friend' from 'foe'. This is in direct contrast to the more co-operative views of politics by Aristotle and Crick. However, a more mixed view between these extremes is provided by Irish political scientist Michael Laver, who noted that:

Politics is about the characteristic blend of conflict and co-operation that can be found so often in human interactions. Pure conflict is war. Pure co-operation is true love. Politics is a mixture of both.

== History ==
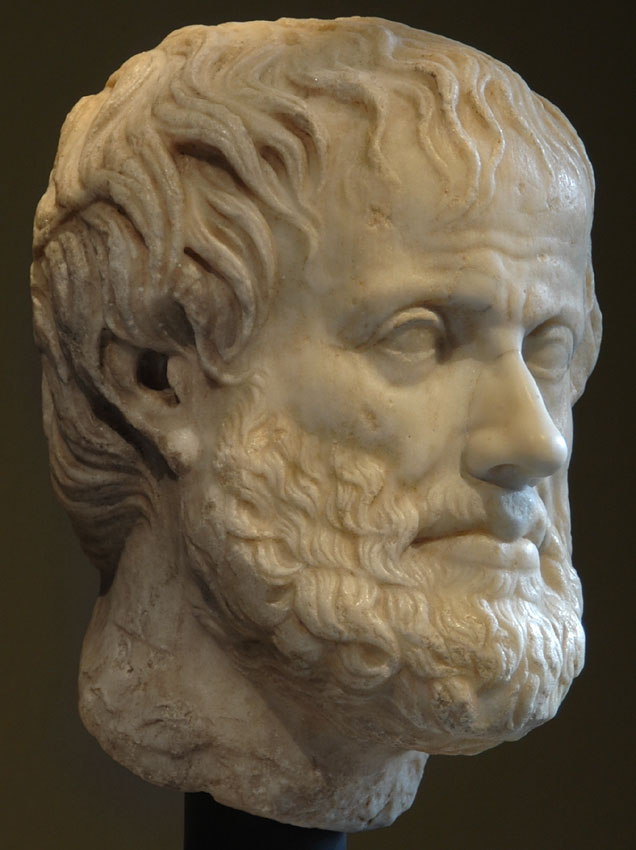
The Greek philosopher Aristotle criticized many of Plato's ideas as impracticable, but, like Plato, he admires balance and moderation and aims at a harmonious city under the rule of law.

=== Prehistoric ===
Early human forms of social organization—bands and tribes—lacked centralized political structures. These are sometimes referred to as stateless societies.

=== Early states ===
In ancient history, civilizations did not have definite boundaries as states have today, and their borders could be more accurately described as frontiers. Early dynastic Sumer, and early dynastic Egypt were the first civilizations to define their borders. Moreover, up to the 12th century, many people lived in non-state societies. These range from relatively egalitarian bands and tribes to complex and highly stratified chiefdoms.

==== State formation ====
There are a number of different theories and hypotheses regarding early state formation that seek generalizations to explain why the state developed in some places but not others. Other scholars believe that generalizations are unhelpful and that each case of early state formation should be treated on its own.

Voluntary theories contend that diverse groups of people came together to form states as a result of some shared rational interest. The theories largely focus on the development of agriculture, and the population and organizational pressure that followed and resulted in state formation. One of the most prominent theories of early and primary state formation is the hydraulic hypothesis, which contends that the state was a result of the need to build and maintain large-scale irrigation projects.

Conflict theories of state formation regard conflict and dominance of some population over another population as key to the formation of states. In contrast with voluntary theories, these arguments believe that people do not voluntarily agree to create a state to maximize benefits, but that states form due to some form of oppression by one group over others. Some theories in turn argue that warfare was critical for state formation.

==== Ancient history ====
The first states of sorts were those of early dynastic Sumer and early dynastic Egypt, which arose from the Uruk period and Predynastic Egypt respectively around approximately 3000 BC. Early dynastic Egypt was based around the Nile River in the north-east of Africa, the kingdom's boundaries being based around the Nile and stretching to areas where oases existed. Early dynastic Sumer was located in southern Mesopotamia, with its borders extending from the Persian Gulf to parts of the Euphrates and Tigris rivers.

Egyptians, Romans, and the Greeks were the first people known to have explicitly formulated a political philosophy of the state, and to have rationally analyzed political institutions. Prior to this, states were described and justified in terms of religious myths.

Several important political innovations of classical antiquity came from the Greek city-states (polis) and the Roman Republic. The Greek city-states before the 4th century granted citizenship rights to their free population; in Athens these rights were combined with a directly democratic form of government that was to have a long afterlife in political thought and history.

=== Modern states ===
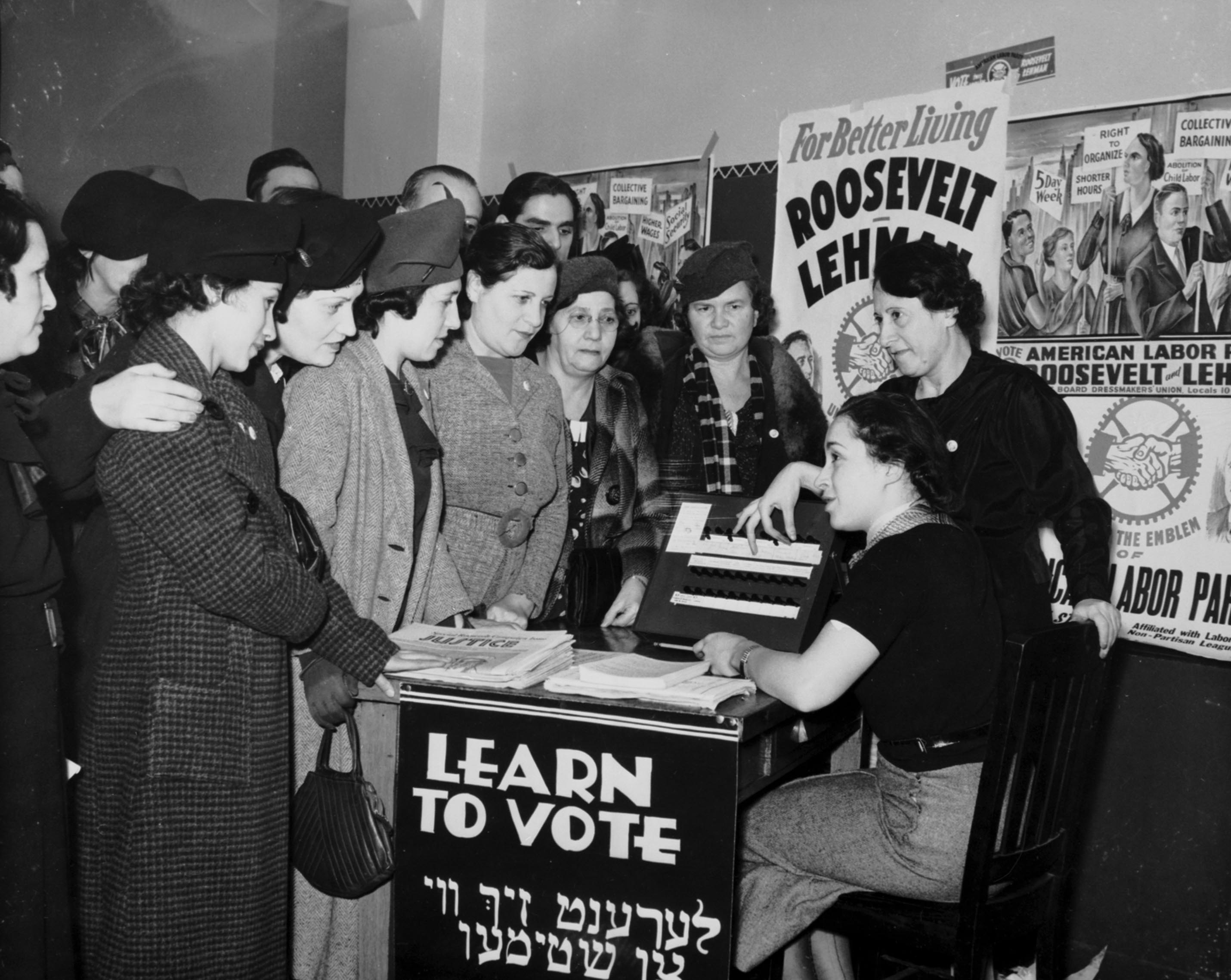
Women voter outreach (1935)

The Peace of Westphalia (1648) is considered by political scientists to be the beginning of the modern international system, in which external powers should avoid interfering in another country's domestic affairs. The principle of non-interference in other countries' domestic affairs was laid out in the mid-18th century by Swiss jurist Emer de Vattel. States became the primary institutional agents in an interstate system of relations. The Peace of Westphalia is said to have ended attempts to impose supranational authority on European states. The "Westphalian" doctrine of states as independent agents was bolstered by the rise in 19th century thought of nationalism, under which legitimate states were assumed to correspond to nations—groups of people united by language and culture.

In Europe, during the 18th century, the classic non-national states were the multinational empires: the Austrian Empire, Kingdom of France, Kingdom of Hungary, the Russian Empire, the Spanish Empire, the Ottoman Empire, and the British Empire. Such empires also existed in Asia, Africa, and the Americas; in the Muslim world, immediately after the death of Muhammad in 632, Caliphates were established, which developed into multi-ethnic transnational empires. The multinational empire was an absolute monarchy ruled by a king, emperor or sultan. The population belonged to many ethnic groups, and they spoke many languages. The empire was dominated by one ethnic group, and their language was usually the language of public administration. The ruling dynasty was usually, but not always, from that group. Some of the smaller European states were not so ethnically diverse, but were also dynastic states, ruled by a royal house. A few of the smaller states survived, such as the independent principalities of Liechtenstein, Andorra, Monaco, and the republic of San Marino.

Most theories see the nation state as a 19th-century European phenomenon, facilitated by developments such as state-mandated education, mass literacy, and mass media. However, historians also note the early emergence of a relatively unified state and identity in Portugal and the Dutch Republic. Scholars such as Steven Weber, David Woodward, Michel Foucault, and Jeremy Black have advanced the hypothesis that the nation state did not arise out of political ingenuity or an unknown undetermined source, nor was it an accident of history or political invention. Rather, the nation state is an inadvertent byproduct of 15th-century intellectual discoveries in political economy, capitalism, mercantilism, political geography, and geography combined with cartography and advances in map-making technologies.

Some nation states, such as Germany and Italy, came into existence at least partly as a result of political campaigns by nationalists, during the 19th century. In both cases, the territory was previously divided among other states, some of them very small. Liberal ideas of free trade played a role in German unification, which was preceded by a customs union, the Zollverein. National self-determination was a key aspect of United States President Woodrow Wilson's Fourteen Points, leading to the dissolution of the Austro-Hungarian Empire and the Ottoman Empire after the First World War, while the Russian Empire became the Soviet Union after the Russian Civil War. Decolonization lead to the creation of new nation states in place of multinational empires in the Third World.

=== Globalization ===
Political globalization began in the 20th century through intergovernmental organizations and supranational unions. The League of Nations was founded after World War I, and after World War II it was replaced by the United Nations. Various international treaties have been signed through it. Regional integration has been pursued by political and fiscal unions such as BRICS, the African Union, ASEAN, the European Union, and Mercosur. International political institutions on the international level include the International Criminal Court, the International Monetary Fund, and the World Trade Organization.

== Political science ==
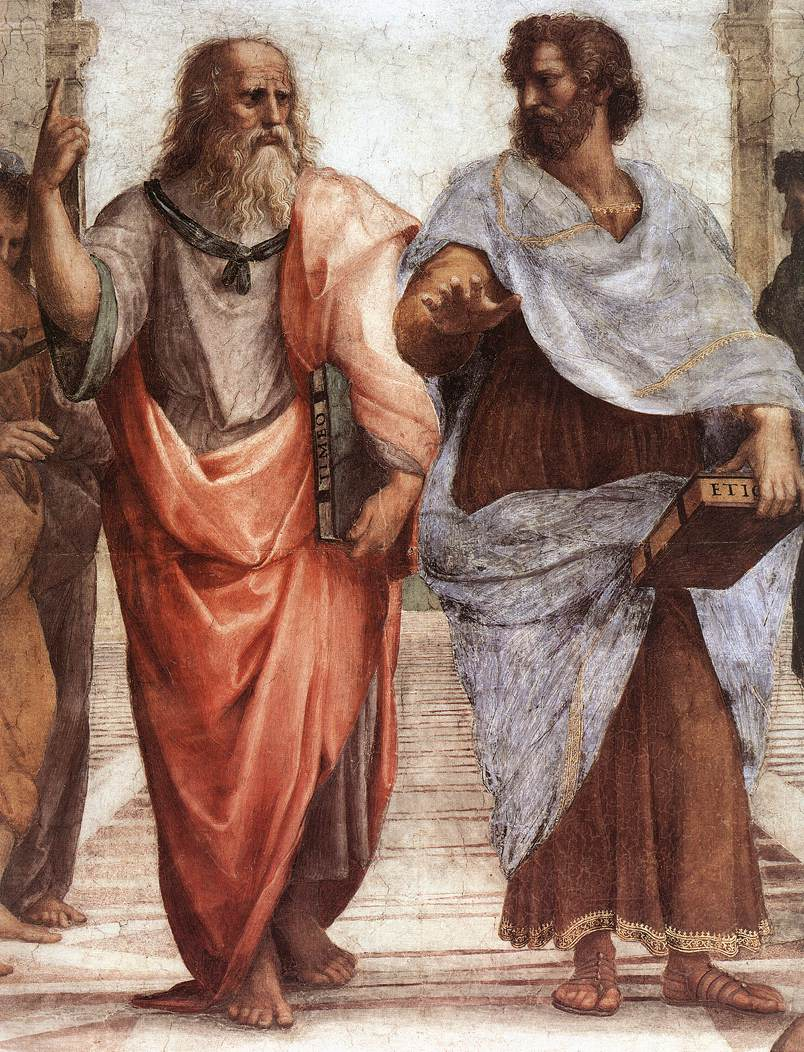
Plato (left) and Aristotle (right), from a detail of The School of Athens, a fresco by Raphael. Plato's Republic and Aristotle's Politics secured the two Greek philosophers as two of the most influential political philosophers.

The study of politics is called political science. It comprises numerous subfields, namely three: Comparative politics, international relations and political philosophy. Political science is related to, and draws upon, the fields of economics, law, sociology, history, philosophy, geography, psychology, psychiatry, anthropology, and neurosciences.

Comparative politics is the science of comparison and teaching of different types of constitutions, political actors, legislature and associated fields. International relations deals with the interaction between nation-states as well as intergovernmental and transnational organizations. Political philosophy is more concerned with the nature of politics and seeks knowledge about topics related to justice, legitimacy, liberty, and the legal foundations of ancient and modern civilizations.

== Political system ==
Map of European nations coloured by percentage of vote governing party got in last election as of 2022

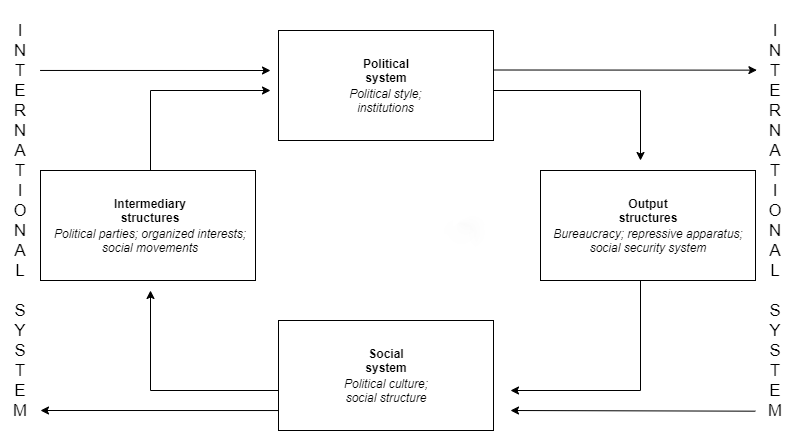
Systems view of politics

The political system defines the process for making official government decisions. It is usually compared to the legal system, economic system, cultural system, and other social systems. According to David Easton, "A political system can be designated as the interactions through which values are authoritatively allocated for a society." Each political system is embedded in a society with its own political culture, and they in turn shape their societies through public policy. The interactions between different political systems are the basis for global politics.

=== Forms of government ===
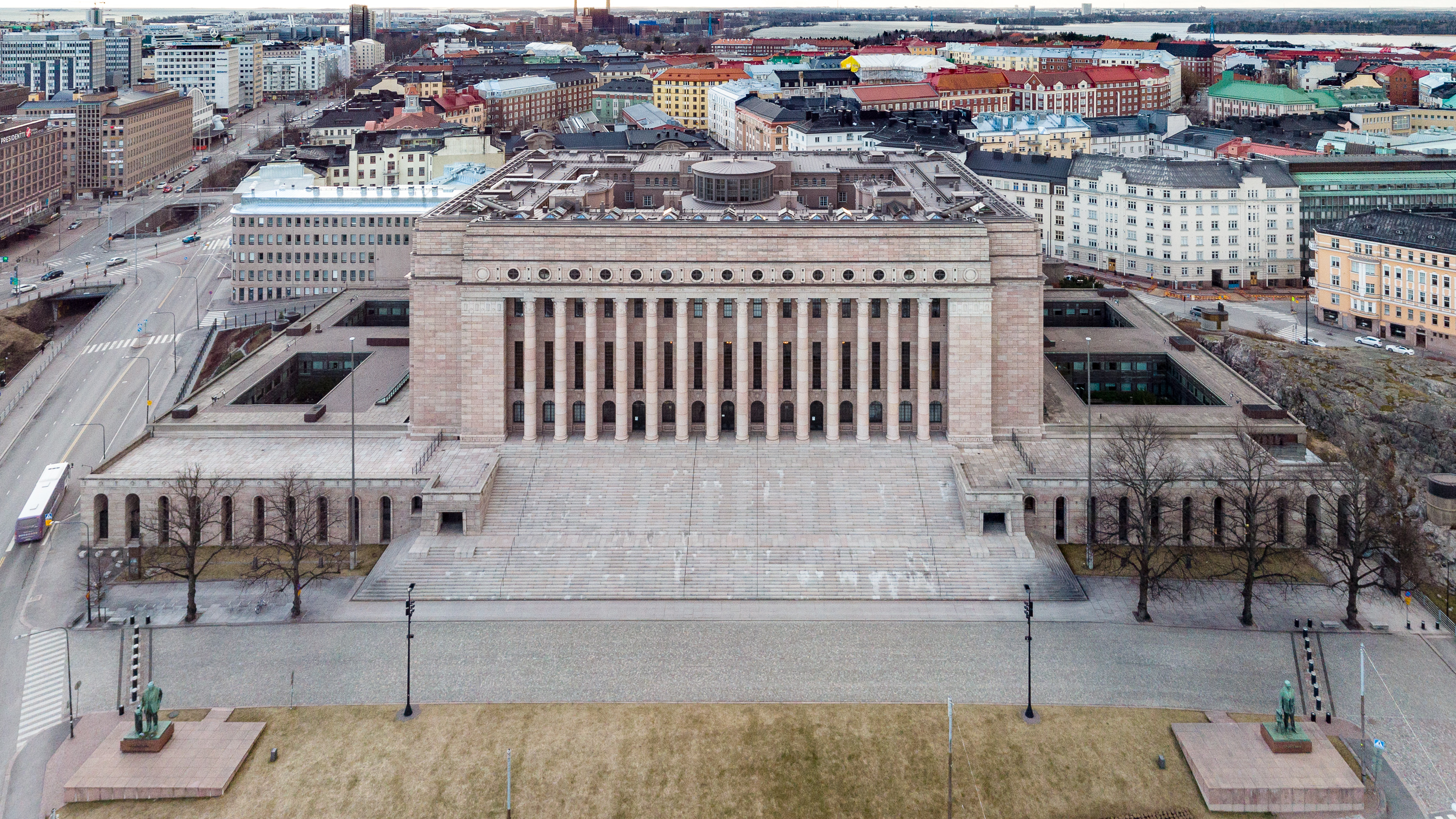
Legislatures are an important political institution. Pictured is the Parliament of Finland.

Forms of government can be classified by several ways. Generally, most governments are either monarchies (including constitutional monarchies) and republics (usually presidential, semi-presidential, or parliamentary). Republics are the most common form of government, with fewer nations being monarchies.

Another model of classifying regimes is by who runs them, such as in a democracy (rule of many), oligarchy (rule by few), or autocracy (rule by one).

==== Source of authority ====
In political philosophy and ethics, political authority refers to the right of an individual or a group to command or govern a state. Political authority grants members of a government the right to rule over citizens using coercion if necessary (i.e., political legitimacy), while imposing an obligation on citizens to obey government orders (i.e., political obligation).

Philosophers commonly distinguish between de facto and de jure political authority: de facto refers to the government's effectiveness in compelling obedience, and de jure concerns whether that capacity to use force is morally justified, and under what conditions it creates a duty to obey the authority's command.

A central question in political philosophy is "To what extent is political authority legitimate?" Views range from political authority having no legitimacy (philosophical anarchism) to political authority being virtually unlimited in scope (totalitarianism), with most theorists having positions between these two extremes.

==== Vertical integration ====
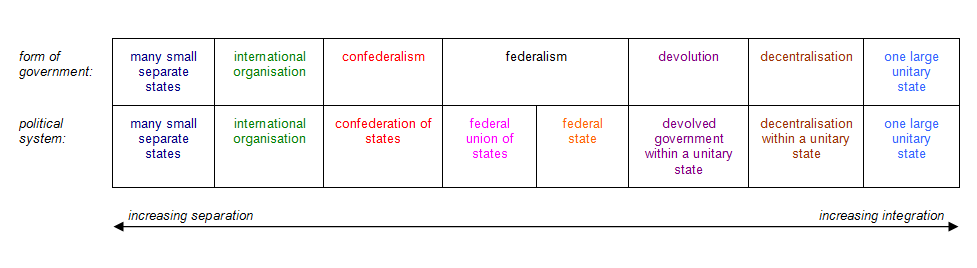
Relation between regional integration and separatism

In terms of level of vertical integration, political systems can be divided into (from least to most integrated) confederations, federations, and unitary states.

=== State ===
Federal states Unitary states No government

All the above forms of government are variations of the same basic polity, the sovereign state. The state has been defined by Max Weber as a political entity that has monopoly on violence within its territory, while the Montevideo Convention holds that states need to have a defined territory; a permanent population; a government; and a capacity to enter into international relations.

A stateless society is a society that is not governed by a state. In stateless societies, there is little concentration of authority; most positions of authority that do exist are very limited in power and are generally not permanently held positions; and social bodies that resolve disputes through predefined rules tend to be small. Stateless societies are highly variable in economic organization and cultural practices.

While stateless societies were the norm in human prehistory, few stateless societies exist today; almost the entire global population resides within the jurisdiction of a sovereign state. In some regions, nominal state authorities may be very weak and wield little or no actual power. Over the course of history most stateless peoples have been integrated into the state-based societies around them.

Some political ideologies consider the state undesirable, and thus consider the formation of a stateless society a goal to be achieved. A central tenet of anarchism is the advocacy of society without states. The type of society sought for varies significantly between anarchist schools of thought, ranging from extreme individualism to complete collectivism. In Marxism, Marx's theory of the state considers that in a post-capitalist society the state, an undesirable institution, would be unnecessary and wither away. A related concept is that of stateless communism, a phrase sometimes used to describe Marx's anticipated post-capitalist society.

=== Constitutions ===
Constitutions are written documents that specify and limit the powers of the different branches of government. Although a constitution is a written document, there is also an unwritten constitution. The unwritten constitution is continually being written by the legislative and judiciary branch of government; this is just one of those cases in which the nature of the circumstances determines the form of government that is most appropriate. England did set the fashion of written constitutions during the Civil War but after the Restoration abandoned them to be taken up later by the American Colonies after their emancipation and then France after the Revolution and the rest of Europe including the European colonies.

=== Political culture ===
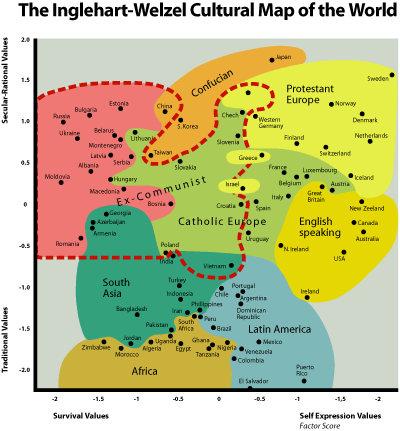
Inglehart-Weltzel cultural map of countries

Political culture describes how culture impacts politics. Every political system is embedded in a particular political culture. Lucian Pye's definition is that, "Political culture is the set of attitudes, beliefs, and sentiments, which give order and meaning to a political process and which provide the underlying assumptions and rules that govern behavior in the political system."

Trust is a major factor in political culture, as its level determines the capacity of the state to function. Postmaterialism is the degree to which a political culture is concerned with issues which are not of immediate physical or material concern, such as human rights and environmentalism. Religion has also an impact on political culture.

=== Political dysfunction ===
Political dysfunctions include gridlock and voter suppression.

==== Political corruption ====
Map of the Corruption Perceptions Index, 2025, as scored by Transparency international. A higher score indicates greater transparency (i.e., less corruption). The score ranges are: Less corrupt 90–100 80–89 70–79 60–69 50–59 / More corrupt 40–49 30–39 20–29 10–19 0–9 No data

Political corruption is the use of power by government officials or their network contacts for illegitimate private gain. Forms of corruption vary, but can include bribery, lobbying, extortion, cronyism, nepotism, parochialism, patronage, influence peddling, graft, and embezzlement. Corruption may facilitate criminal enterprise, such as drug trafficking, money laundering, and human trafficking, although it is not restricted to these activities.

Over time, corruption has been defined differently. For example, while performing work for a government or as a representative, it is unethical to accept a gift. Any gift could be construed as a scheme to lure the recipient towards some biases. In most cases, the gift is seen as an intention to seek certain favors, such as work promotion, tipping in order to win a contract, job, or exemption from certain tasks in the case of a junior worker handing in the gift to a senior employee who can be key in winning the favor.

Some forms of corruption, now called "institutional corruption", are distinguished from bribery and other kinds of obvious personal gain. For example, certain state institutions may consistently act against the interests of the public, such as by misusing public funds for their own interest, or by engaging in illegal or immoral behavior with impunity. Bribery and overt criminal acts by individuals may not necessarily be evident but the institution nonetheless acts immorally as a whole. The mafia state phenomenon is an example of institutional corruption.

An illegal act by an officeholder constitutes political corruption only if the act is directly related to their official duties, is done under color of law or involves trading in influence. The activities that constitute illegal corruption differ depending on the country or jurisdiction. For instance, some political funding practices that are legal in one place may be illegal in another. In some cases, government officials have broad or ill-defined powers, which make it difficult to distinguish between legal and illegal actions. Worldwide, bribery alone is estimated to involve over 1 trillion US dollars annually. A state of unrestrained political corruption is known as a kleptocracy, literally meaning "rule by thieves".

==== Proxy politics ====
The term "proxy politics" refers to specific forms of political influences and actions that are conducted through proxy political parties (mainly in domestic politics), or through proxy wars (mainly in international politics).

==== Insincere politics ====
The words "politics" and "political" are sometimes used as pejoratives to mean political action that is deemed to be overzealous, performative, or insincere.

== Levels of politics ==
=== Macropolitics ===
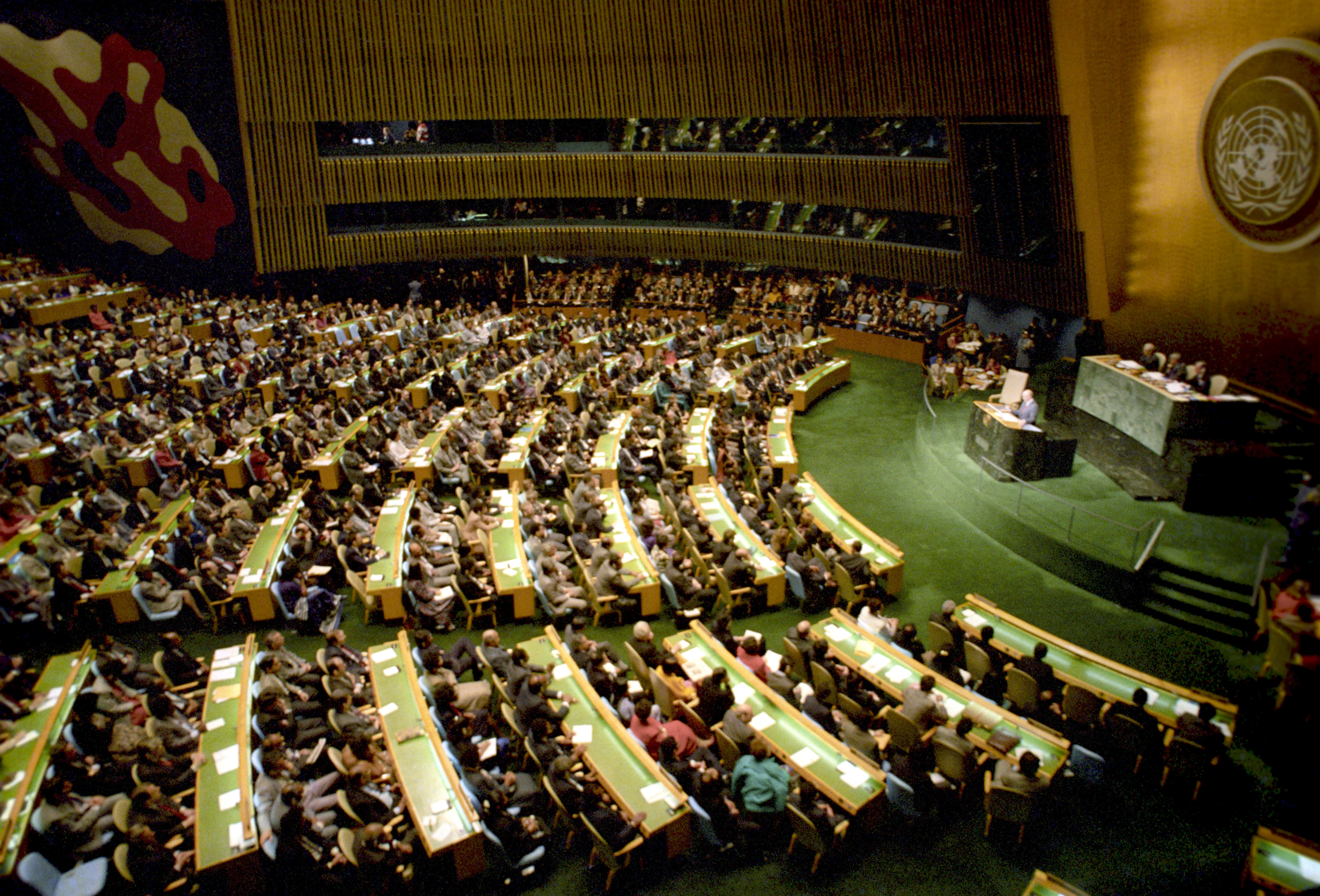
Mikhail Gorbachev addressing the UN General Assembly in 1988

Macropolitics can either describe political issues that affect an entire political system (e.g. the nation state), or refer to interactions between political systems (e.g. international relations).

Global politics (or world politics) covers all aspects of politics that affect multiple political systems, in practice meaning any political phenomenon crossing national borders. This can include cities, nation-states, multinational corporations, non-governmental organizations or international organizations. An important element is international relations: the relations between nation-states may be peaceful when they are conducted through diplomacy, or they may be violent, which is described as war. States that are able to exert strong international influence are referred to as superpowers, whereas less-powerful ones may be called regional or middle powers. The international system of power is called the world order, which is affected by the balance of power that defines the degree of polarity in the system. Emerging powers are potentially destabilizing to it, especially if they display revanchism or irredentism.

Politics inside the limits of political systems, which in contemporary context correspond to national borders, are referred to as domestic politics. This includes most forms of public policy, such as social policy, economic policy, or law enforcement, which are executed by the state bureaucracy.

=== Mesopolitics ===
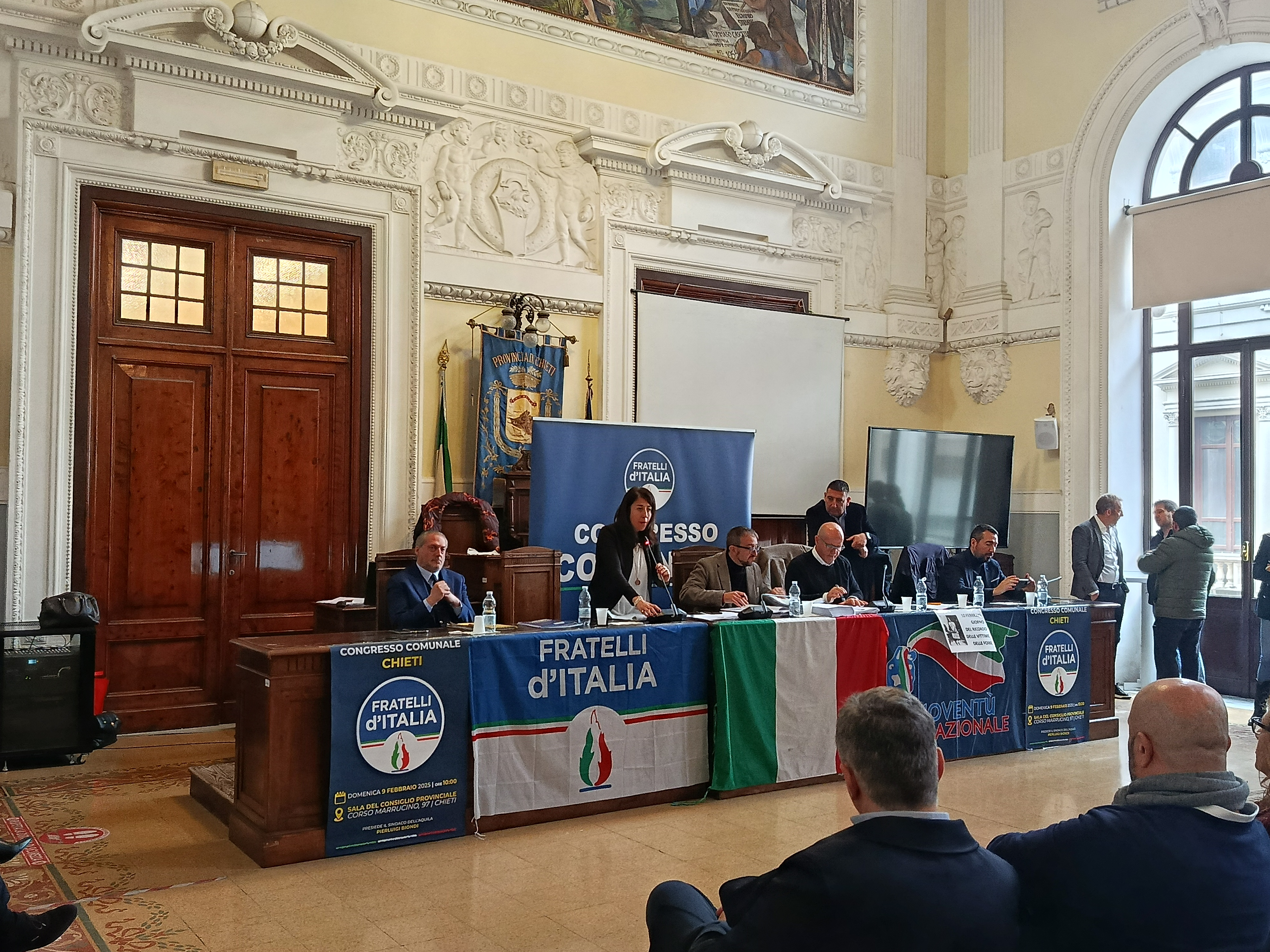
Local political event organized by Brothers of Italy in the council room of the Province of Chieti in 2025

Mesopolitics describes the politics of intermediary structures within a political system, such as national political parties or movements.

A political party is a political organization that typically seeks to attain and maintain political power within government, usually by participating in political campaigns, educational outreach, or protest actions. Parties often espouse an expressed ideology or vision, bolstered by a written platform with specific goals, forming a coalition among disparate interests.

Political parties within a particular political system together form the party system, which can be either multiparty, two-party, dominant-party, or one-party, depending on the level of pluralism. This is affected by characteristics of the political system, including its electoral system. According to Duverger's law, first-past-the-post systems are likely to lead to two-party systems, while proportional representation systems are more likely to create a multiparty system.

=== Micropolitics ===
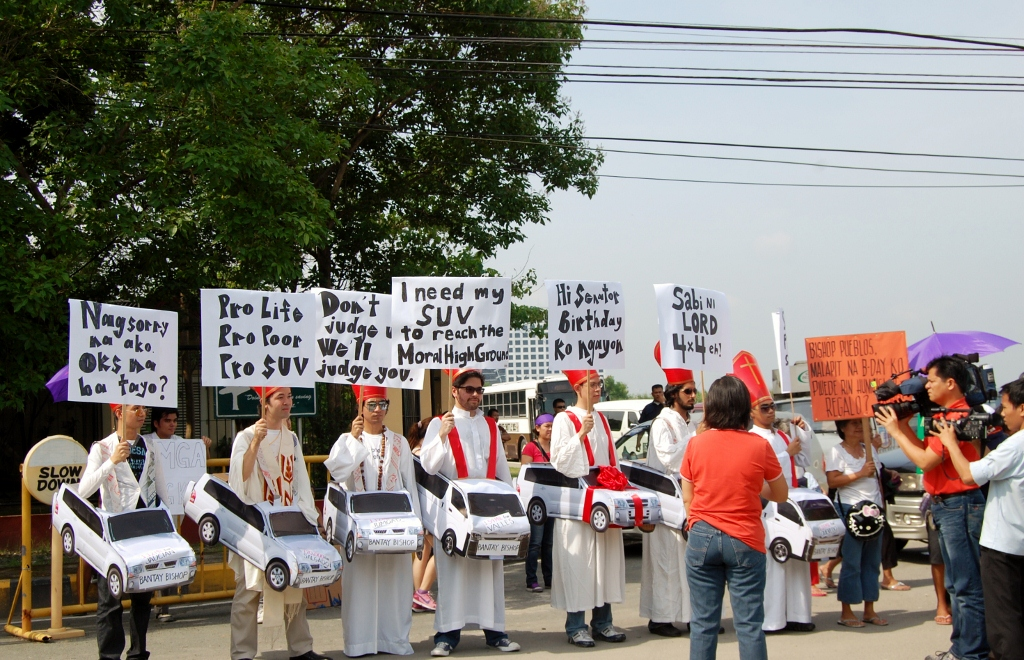
Filipino protest for a local political controversy involving the Pajero bishop in 2011

Micropolitics describes the actions of individual actors within the political system. This is often described as political participation.

== Political values ==
=== Democracy ===
Democracy is a system of processing conflicts in which outcomes depend on what participants do, but no single force controls what occurs and its outcomes. The uncertainty of outcomes is inherent in democracy. Democracy makes all forces struggle repeatedly to realize their interests and devolves power from groups of people to sets of rules.

Among modern political theorists, there are three contending conceptions of democracy: aggregative, deliberative, and radical.

==== Aggregation ====
The theory of aggregative democracy claims that the aim of the democratic processes is to solicit the preferences of citizens, and aggregate them together to determine what social policies the society should adopt. Therefore, proponents of this view hold that democratic participation should primarily focus on voting, where the policy with the most votes gets implemented.

Different variants of aggregative democracy exist. Under minimalism, democracy is a system of government in which citizens have given teams of political leaders the right to rule in periodic elections. According to this minimalist conception, citizens cannot and should not "rule" because, for example, on most issues, most of the time, they have no clear views or their views are not well-founded. Joseph Schumpeter articulated this view most famously in his book Capitalism, Socialism, and Democracy. Contemporary proponents of minimalism include William H. Riker, Adam Przeworski, and Richard Posner.

According to the theory of direct democracy, on the other hand, citizens should vote directly, not through their representatives, on legislative proposals. Proponents of direct democracy offer varied reasons to support this view. Political activity can be valuable in itself, it socialises and educates citizens, and popular participation can check powerful elites. Most importantly, citizens do not rule themselves unless they directly decide laws and policies.

Governments will tend to produce laws and policies that are close to the views of the median voter—with half to their left and the other half to their right. This is not a desirable outcome as it represents the action of self-interested and somewhat unaccountable political elites competing for votes. Anthony Downs suggests that ideological political parties are necessary to act as a mediating broker between individual and governments. Downs laid out this view in his 1957 book An Economic Theory of Democracy.

==== Polyarchy ====
Robert A. Dahl argues that the fundamental democratic principle is that, when it comes to binding collective decisions, each person in a political community is entitled to have his/her interests be given equal consideration (not necessarily that all people are equally satisfied by the collective decision). He uses the term polyarchy to refer to societies in which there exists a certain set of institutions and procedures which are perceived as leading to such democracy. First and foremost among these institutions is the regular occurrence of free and open elections which are used to select representatives who then manage all or most of the public policy of the society. However, these polyarchic procedures may not create a full democracy if, for example, poverty prevents political participation. Similarly, Ronald Dworkin argues that "democracy is a substantive, not a merely procedural, ideal".

==== Deliberation ====
Deliberative democracy is based on the notion that democracy is government by deliberation. Unlike aggregative democracy, deliberative democracy holds that, for a democratic decision to be legitimate, it must be preceded by authentic deliberation, not merely the aggregation of preferences that occurs in voting. Authentic deliberation is deliberation among decision-makers that is free from distortions of unequal political power, such as power a decision-maker obtained through economic wealth or the support of interest groups. If the decision-makers cannot reach consensus after authentically deliberating on a proposal, then they vote on the proposal using a form of majority rule.

=== Equality ===
Two-axis political compass chart with a horizontal socio-economic axis and a vertical socio-cultural axis and ideologically representative political colours, an example for a frequently used model of the political spectrum

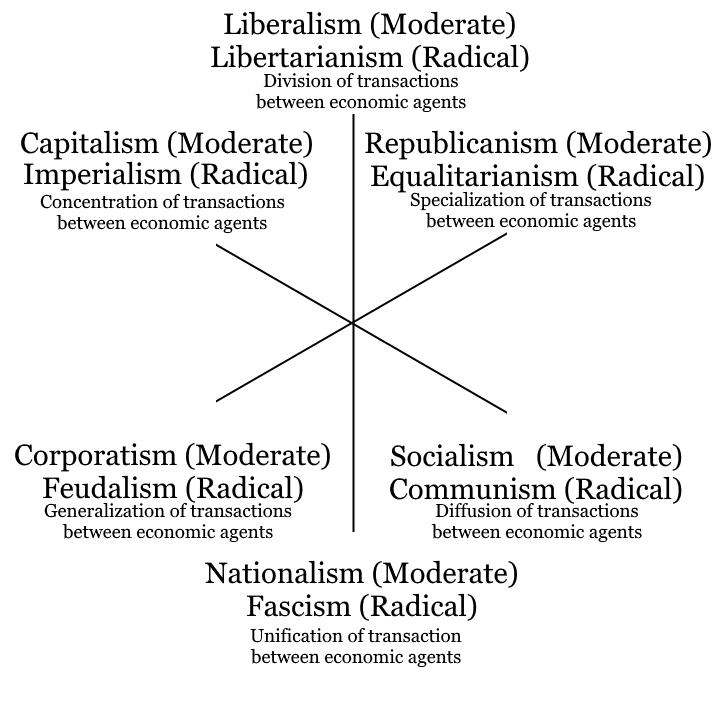
Three axis model of political ideologies with both moderate and radical versions and the goals of their policies

Equality is a state of affairs in which all people within a specific society or isolated group have the same rights. Social equality requires the absence of legally enforced social class or caste boundaries and the absence of discrimination based on by an inalienable aspect of a person's identity. To this end, there must be equal justice under law, and equal opportunity regardless of, sex, gender, ethnicity, age, sexual orientation, origin, caste or class, income or property, language, religion, convictions, opinions, health or disability. Equality can be distinguished in formal equality and substantive equality.

=== Political spectrum ===
A common way of understanding politics is through the left–right political spectrum, which ranges from left-wing politics via centrism to right-wing politics. This classification dates from the French Revolution, when those members of the National Assembly who supported the republic, the common people and a secular society sat on the left and supporters of the monarchy, aristocratic privilege and the Church sat on the right.

Left-wing politics tends to support social equality. The center-left advocates for more reformist approaches, for example that of social democracy. The more extreme elements of the left, named the far-left, tend to support revolutionary means for achieving this. This includes ideologies such as Communism and Marxism.

The center-right may be less clear-cut and more mixed in this regard, with neoconservatives supporting the spread of free markets and capitalism, and one-nation conservatives more open to social welfare programs. Some elements of the right are motivated by conservatism, which seeks to conserve what it sees as the important elements of society such as law and order, limited government and preserving individual freedoms. The more extreme elements of the right, named the far-right, tend to support revolutionary means for achieving this, with examples of such ideologies have included Fascism and Nazism.

According to Norberto Bobbio, one of the major exponents of this distinction, the left believes in attempting to eradicate social inequality—believing it to be unethical or unnatural, while the right regards most social inequality as the result of ineradicable natural inequalities, and sees attempts to enforce social equality as utopian or authoritarian. Some ideologies, notably Christian Democracy, claim to combine left and right-wing politics; according to Geoffrey K. Roberts and Patricia Hogwood, "In terms of ideology, Christian Democracy has incorporated many of the views held by liberals, conservatives and socialists within a wider framework of moral and Christian principles." Movements which claim or formerly claimed to be above the left-right divide include Fascist Terza Posizione economic politics in Italy and Peronism in Argentina.

The salience of political issues can be measured with surveys and can vary over time.

=== Freedom ===
Political freedom (also known as political liberty or autonomy) is a central concept in political thought and one of the most important features of democratic societies. Negative liberty has been described as freedom from oppression or coercion and unreasonable external constraints on action, often enacted through civil and political rights, while positive liberty is the absence of disabling conditions for an individual and the fulfillment of enabling conditions, e.g. economic compulsion, in a society. This capability approach to freedom requires economic, social and cultural rights in order to be realized.

==== Authoritarianism and libertarianism ====
Authoritarianism and libertarianism disagree the amount of individual freedom each person possesses in that society relative to the state. One author describes authoritarian political systems as those where "individual rights and goals are subjugated to group goals, expectations and conformities", while libertarians generally oppose the state and hold the individual as sovereign. In their purest form, libertarians are anarchists, who argue for the total abolition of the state, of political parties and of other political entities, while the purest authoritarians are, by definition, totalitarians who support state control over all aspects of society.

For instance, classical liberalism (also known as laissez-faire liberalism) is a doctrine stressing individual freedom and limited government. This includes the importance of human rationality, individual property rights, free markets, natural rights, the protection of civil liberties, constitutional limitation of government, and individual freedom from restraint as exemplified in the writings of John Locke, Adam Smith, David Hume, David Ricardo, Voltaire, Montesquieu and others. According to the libertarian Institute for Humane Studies, "the libertarian, or 'classical liberal', perspective is that individual well-being, prosperity, and social harmony are fostered by 'as much liberty as possible' and 'as little government as necessary'." For anarchist political philosopher L. Susan Brown (1993), "liberalism and anarchism are two political philosophies that are fundamentally concerned with individual freedom yet differ from one another in very distinct ways. Anarchism shares with liberalism a radical commitment to individual freedom while rejecting liberalism's competitive property relations."

== See also ==
- Historic recurrence
- Horseshoe theory
- Index of politics articles – alphabetical list of political subjects
- List of banned political parties
- List of politics awards
- List of years in politics
- Outline of political science – structured list of political topics, arranged by subject area
- Political lists – lists of political topics
- Political censorship
- Political corruption
- Political literacy
- Political polarization
- Political representation of nature
- Political scandal
- Political stability
- Regime
