= Virginia school of political economy =

School of economic thought

The Virginia School of political economy is a school of economic thought originating at the Thomas Jefferson Center for Studies in Political Economy of the University of Virginia in the 1950s and 1960s. Some of its proponents established the Center for Study of Public Choice at Virginia Tech in 1969, moving it to George Mason University in 1983. The school focuses primarily on public choice theory, constitutional economics, and law and economics.

== Development ==
The Virginia school emerged first at the Thomas Jefferson Center at the University of Virginia established by James M. Buchanan and G. Warren Nutter in 1957. It was there that Ronald Coase formulated his famous theorem on the problem of social cost (1960) and that Buchanan and Gordon Tullock wrote The Calculus of Consent in 1962. The latter would form the basis of the Virginia school of thought, as the foundational text in public choice theory.

In 1969, Buchanan, Tullock, and Charles J. Goetz established the Center for Study of Public Choice at Virginia Tech, which moved with them to George Mason University in 1983. Other prominent scholars associated with the school include Dennis C. Mueller, Robert D. Tollison, Andrew B. Whinston, and Leland B. Yeager.

== Economic approach ==
The Virginia approach to political economy focuses on comparing private and public sector institutions as imperfect alternatives. The Virginia approach is also favored by some economists of the Chicago and Austrian schools. Virginia School economists are often seen as 'fellow travelers' with Austrian economists, as members of both schools of economic thought generally favor free-market outcomes.

There are several main lines of research in the Virginia School. James Buchanan and Gordon Tullock were among the earliest economists to apply economic analysis to national constitutions; this is one of the greatest and longest-lasting contributions that The Calculus of Consent made in the field of public choice. Tullock also founded the modern rent seeking literature. Mancur Olson founded modern research on collective action and special interest groups. Olson taught at the University of Maryland, not one of the universities of Virginia, but his work deals with ideas that are central to the Virginia school of thought, including the effects of special interest groups.

Despite some common ground, the Virginia School is opposed to the Chicago school of political economy on two fundamental points. Chicago believes that politics tends towards efficiency due to the fact that free-riders provoke stiffening resistance in risk takers, because of the exponentially increasing deadweight loss imposed by free-riding. Chicago also believes that, because political markets tend towards efficiency, policy advice by scholars is irrelevant. Charles Rowley is a prominent opponent of these notions: in the Encyclopedia of Public Choice he writes that Chicago's "... interpretation of the political process emanates from a fundamentally flawed application of ... microeconomics to the political marketplace ... [W]hile the Journal of Political Economy publishes papers that defend the U.S. federal farm program as an efficient mechanism for transferring income to poor farmers, there is justifiable cause to worry whether CPE [Chicago political economy] scholars and their journal editors ever look out from their ivory towers and survey the real world."

The Public Choice Society, a 501(c)(3) organization that facilitates research and discussion of the social sciences, is an outgrowth of the Virginia School.
