= An Economic Theory of Democracy =

1957 book by Anthony Downs

An Economic Theory of Democracy is a treatise of economics written by Anthony Downs, published in 1957. The book set forth a model with precise conditions under which economic theory could be applied to non-market political decision-making. It also suggested areas of empirical research that could be tested to confirm the validity of his conclusions in the model. Much of this offshoot research eventually became integrated into public choice theory. Downs' theory abstains from making normative statements about public policy choices and instead focuses on what is rational, given the relevant incentives, for government to do.

== Contents ==
Downs applies the assumption of rational, self-interested nature of individuals in a democracy. In this framing, political parties are modelled as teams seeking to maximize votes to win, formulating policies to win elections rather than winning elections to formulate policies. Voters are modelled as utility maximizers, supporting the party that gives them the greatest benefit. As voters and parties act under uncertainty, and with costly information, most of the work is focused on how imperfect information shapes political behavior.

In chapter eight of the book Downs explains how the concept of ideology is central to his theory. Depending on the ideological distribution of voters in a given political community, electoral outcomes can be stable and peaceful or wildly varied and even result in violent revolution. The likely number of political parties can also be identified if one also considers the electoral structure. If the ideological positions of voters are displayed in the form of a graph and if that graph shows a single peak, then a median voter can be identified and in a representative democracy, the choice of candidates and the choice of policies will gravitate toward the positions of the median voter. Conversely, if the graph of ideological distribution is double-peaked, indicating that most voters are either extremely liberal or extremely conservative, the tendency toward political consensus or political equilibrium is difficult to attain because legislators representing each mode are penalized by voters for attempting to achieve consensus with the other side by supporting policies representative of a middle position. Here is a list of the key propositions Downs attempts to prove in chapter eight:

1. A two-party democracy cannot provide stable and effective government unless there is a large measure of ideological consensus among its citizens.
2. Parties in a two-party system deliberately change their platforms so that they resemble one another; whereas parties in a multi-party system try to remain as ideologically distinct from each other as possible.
3. If the distribution of ideologies in a society's citizenry remains constant, its political system will move toward a position of equilibrium in which the number of parties and their ideological positions are stable over time.
4. New parties can be most successfully launched immediately after some significant change in the distribution of ideological views among eligible voters.
5. In a two-party system, it is rational for each party to encourage voters to be irrational by making its platform vague and ambiguous.

The conditions under which his theory prevails are outlined in chapter two. Many of these conditions have been challenged by later scholarship. In anticipation of such criticism, Downs quotes Milton Friedman in chapter two that: “Theoretical models should be tested primarily by the accuracy of their predictions rather than by the reality of their assumptions”.

In a 2004 study, Bernard Grofman argued that "A careful reading of Downs offers a much more sophisticated and nuanced portrait of the factors affecting party differentiation than the simplistic notion that, in plurality elections, we ought to expect party convergence to the views of the median voter." According to Grofman, recent research in the Downsian tradition expected nonconvergence of parties in a two-party democracy.

== Reception ==
An Economic Theory of Democracy is regarded as a founding work of public choice theory. Grofman has described it as one of the most influential and frequently cited works in social science of the post-war period. The empirical predictions of the model are widely debated. The book's assumption of rational voters with complete information was anticipated by Downs himself.

== See also ==
- Mancur Olson
- James Buchanan
- Gordon Tullock
- Public choice
- The Calculus of Consent
