= Samaritan's dilemma =

Dilemma regarding charity

The Samaritan's dilemma is a dilemma in the act of charity. It hinges on the idea that when presented with charity, in some locations such as a soup kitchen, a person will act in one of two ways: using the charity to improve their situation, or coming to rely on charity as a means of survival. The term Samaritan's dilemma was coined by economist James M. Buchanan as a moral hazard.

The dilemma's name is a reference to the biblical Parable of the Good Samaritan.

== Background ==
In 1970 Buchanan said that the phrase "Samaritan's dilemma" was used by economists to describe how a benevolent individual or institution transfers what was intended to be short-term charity to those in need, only to find that those on the receiving end are not using the assistance to improve themselves but instead became dependent on the relief. As a result, both suffer. This was part of a paper entitled, "The 'Social' Efficiency of Education", at the September 1970 meeting in Munich of the Mont Pelerin Society (MPS), in which he summarized the crisis in higher education from the perspective of economics. He said the cause of the crisis was partly because of modern societies' "economic affluence" and it had resulted in the "relatively new 'parasitic option' out of the more general "Samaritan's dilemma." In the year before the MPS meeting, Buchanan had spent the 1968–1969 academic year at the University of California, Los Angeles. He had left the University of Virginia for UCLA briefly in response to "academic disagreement with the left-leaning administration" there. Unfortunately it was the time of student protests; the People's Park protest in Berkeley reached a climax in May, when under orders from then-Governor Ronald Reagan, the California Highway Patrol and Berkeley police officers clashed with students in the "most violent confrontation in the university's history." Buchanan shared his concerns with the MPS membership that the ideal university as "ivory tower" had transformed into an "institutional location for the free spirits, for the intellect gadflys, for the heretics of all ages." Students, he wrote, had become disruptive, destructive, "unrestrained" "child-men", "animals...in the streets", lacking in a "sense of mutual respect and tolerance" and flaunting "ordinary rules of conduct". He described how they had "literally" burned college buildings and banks "this year in America." He cautioned that neither the "ordinary citizen nor his political representative" have the courage to force major change by cutting off funding to these students. Instead they allow them to live like "parasites", feeding off others without "contributing" to the well-being of others. In his 1975 essay, Buchanan describes how societies, like individuals, need to make courageous decisions from a higher moral perspective to resolve "social problems" by avoiding the trap of asymmetrical situations between the Samaritan and those in need. He laments a "collective loss of will" to do so.

== Samaritan's dilemma in disaster readiness ==
A study published in 2016 looked at 5089 major natural disasters in 81 developing countries over a 33-year period. Results showed that the countries that received natural disaster relief had less incentives to provide their own natural disaster protections. This effect is exacerbated the poorer and less-developed the country is that receives the aid.

== Avoiding the Samaritan's dilemma ==
Much foreign aid comes in the form of monetary compensation for damages or direct relief such as food or water. This type of direct aid does not provide any incentive for the recipient to become independent. By introducing incentives that developing countries can meet by building up natural disaster protection the effects of the Samaritan's dilemma can be effectively mitigated.

== See also ==
- Criticisms of welfare
- Aid
- Moral hazard
