= Gordon Tullock =

American economist (1922–2014)

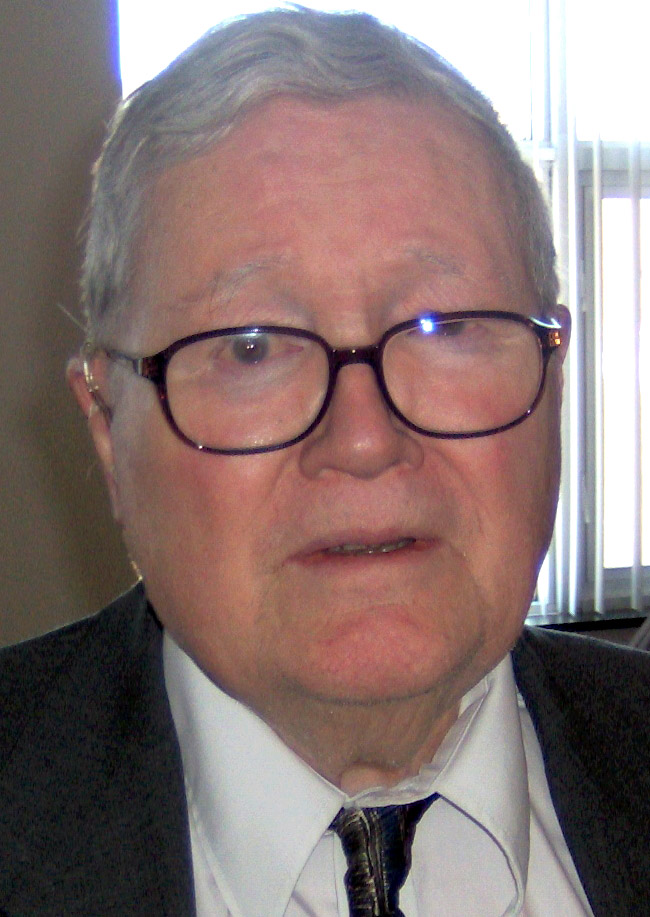
- Tullock in 2007
- Born: February 13, 1922; Rockford, Illinois, U.S.
- Died: November 3, 2014 (aged 92); Des Moines, Iowa, U.S.

Academic background
- Education: University of Chicago
- Influences: Henry Calvert Simons; Duncan Black; Ludwig von Mises

Academic work
- Discipline: Law and economics Public choice theory
- School or tradition: Virginia School
- Institutions: George Mason University
- Notable ideas: Rent-seeking
- Website: Information at IDEAS / RePEc

Gordon Tullock (/ˈtʌlək/; February 13, 1922 – November 3, 2014) was an American professor of law and economics at the George Mason University School of Law. He is best known for his work on public choice theory, the application of economic thinking to political issues. He was one of the founding figures in his field.

== Early life and education ==
Tullock was born February 13, 1922, in Rockford, Illinois, where he attended and graduated from Rockford Central High School. Tullock attended the University of Chicago where, after a break for military service during World War II, he received a J.D. in 1947. He later completed Chinese language instruction at Yale and Cornell universities.

== Career ==
Following a brief period in private practice, he joined the Foreign Service in fall 1947, and was posted to Tianjin, China and later to Hong Kong and Korea. In 1956, he resigned from the Foreign Service. While he originally intended to pursue a career as a foreign trader in the Far East, his work on The Politics of Bureaucracy eventually led him to begin collaboration with James M. Buchanan at the University of Virginia while Tullock worked at the University of South Carolina teaching international studies.

Tullock's collaboration with Buchanan produced The Calculus of Consent: Logical Foundations of Constitutional Democracy (1962), which quickly became a seminal work in the new field of public choice. He later joined Buchanan as a faculty colleague at Virginia. Despite Tullock never having taken any economics courses, for four years Buchanan and Tullock ran an economics research program. They founded a new journal for their field (1966), first called Papers in Non-Market Economics and eventually titled Public Choice, where they invited articles applying economic theory to all sorts of non-market phenomena, especially in the realm of government and politics. Despite the success of the book and the journal, disagreements with the UVA administration eventually led Tullock to leave.

In 1967, Tullock identified many of the concepts of what came to be known as rent-seeking in a seminal paper.

Tullock moved to Virginia Polytechnical Institute (VPI, now called Virginia Tech) in 1968 and was joined by Buchanan a year later. There they continued the Public Choice Society and the journal, of which Tullock remained editor until 1990. At VPI, Tullock wrote a number of influential articles and books, including Private Wants, Public Means (1970), The Logic of the Law (1971), The Social Dilemma (1974), and The Vote Motive (1976).

In 1983, Tullock and the Center for Study of Public Choice moved to George Mason University, at the time a relatively unknown school in Fairfax, Virginia. Tullock taught at GMU from 1983 to 1987 and at the University of Arizona from 1987 to 1999. He continued to publish widely (more than 150 papers and 23 books in all), including "The Economics of Wealth and Poverty" (1986), Autocracy (1987), Rent Seeking (1993), The Economics of Non-Human Societies (1994) and On Voting: A Public Choice Approach (1998). In 1999 he returned to George Mason as a professor of law and economics, where he retired in 2008.

Tullock's book, The Politics of Bureaucracy, has been criticized for overlooking a substantial body of literature. A number of authors have criticized Tullock and the public choice tradition as being too simplistic in its explanation of political behavior.

== Rent-seeking ==
Tullock developed a theory referred to as rent-seeking, adapted from the term and concept introduced by economist David Ricardo in the 19th century. Rent seeking, according to public choice theory, is securing profits through the political process rather than the market process of exchange. An example of rent seeking is when a firm, union, or special-interest group lobbies political actors (e.g., politicians or bureaucrats) to influence legislation in a beneficial manner. This can lead to moral hazard when politicians make policy decisions based on the lobby instead of the efficiency of the policy.

Tullock also formulated and considered the Tullock paradox, namely, the paradox of why rent-seeking is so cheap.

== Tullock's spike ==
The name "Tullock's spike" refers to a thought experiment in which Tullock suggested that if governments were serious about reducing road casualties, they should mandate that a sharp spike be installed in the center of each car's steering wheel, to increase the probability that an accident would be fatal to the driver. Tullock's idea was that the normal process of risk compensation would then lead to safer driving by the affected drivers, thereby actually reducing driving fatalities.

== Awards and recognition ==
In 1994 Tullock was awarded an honorary Ph.D. from the University of Chicago and in 1998 became a distinguished fellow of the American Economic Association. He served as President of the Southern Economic Association, the International Atlantic Economic Society (1998–1999), the Western Economic Association, The Association For Private Enterprise Education and the Public Choice Society. In 1996 he was elected to the American Political Science Review Hall of Fame. He was sometimes considered a longshot candidate for the Nobel Memorial Prize in Economic Sciences.

== Death ==
On November 3, 2014, Tullock died at the age of 92 in Des Moines.
