= Economics imperialism =

Expansion of economic analysis into other areas of study

Economics imperialism (sometimes called "economic imperialism" — but distinct from the economic imperialism involving the role of economic behavior in (say) geopolitical imperialism) is the economic analysis of non-economic aspects of life, such as crime, law, the family, prejudice, tastes, irrational behavior, politics, sociology, culture, religion, war, science, and research. Related usage of the term goes back as far as the 1930s. Modern economics imperialism's birth is due primarily to Gary Becker (1930-2014) from the Chicago school of economics.

The emergence of such analysis has been attributed to a method that, like that of the physical sciences, permits refutable implications testable by standard statistical techniques. Central to that approach are "[t]he combined postulates of maximizing behavior, stable preferences and market equilibrium, applied relentlessly and unflinchingly". It has been asserted that these and a focus on economic efficiency have been ignored in other social sciences and have "allowed economics to invade intellectual territory that was previously deemed to be outside the discipline's realm".

Justin Fox suggests that other social sciences have also made forays into economics, such as psychology (with Daniel Kahnemann and Amos Tversky's work on prospect theory), economic anthropology and more recent economic sociology.

== Colonization of other disciplines ==
Critics argue that the trend of using economic theories to analyze topics in other disciplines causes an over-reliance on economic rationales for human behavior, neglects other explanations, narrows the lens through which policymakers make decisions, and thus colonizes other disciplines. Some academics from other disciplines argue that the need for economic imperialism, or application of positive economic theory to new areas, is built into the reputational structure of the mainstream US academic discipline of economics.

== See also ==
- Constitutional economics
- Cultural economics
- Economics of religion
- Economic sociology
- Family economics
- Law and economics
- Public choice theory
- Political economy
- Happiness economics
