= Public choice =

Economic theory applied to political science

Public choice, or public choice theory, is a formal theory of political and social science that applies economic methods—namely, rational choice theory, game theory, decision theory, and social choice theory—to study political agents (e.g. officials, bureaucrats, and voters) and their interactions. Public choice research includes theories of political behaviour, political economics, public economy, and constitutional economics.

Public choice theories generally share a number of assumptions, methods, and areas of interest. Researchers emphasise the applicability of markets in the political system, the self-interested nature of agents, and the nature of decisions as a combination of individual choices rather than as an aggregate whole. Empirical methods are also relied upon by some public choice theorists in testing and validating economic models of public choice.

Several notable public choice scholars have been awarded the Nobel Prize in Economics, including Kenneth Arrow (1972), James M. Buchanan (1986), George Stigler (1982), Gary Becker (1992), Amartya Sen (1998), Vernon Smith (2002), and Elinor Ostrom (2009). Buchanan, Smith, and Ostrom were former presidents of the Public Choice Society.

== Theory and methods ==
Public choice theory is rooted in skepticism of treating government as though it attempts "to maximize some kind sort of welfare function for society", and as distinct from characterizations of self-interested economic agents, such as those in business. By contrast, public choice theory models government as made up of officials who, besides pursuing the public interest, may act to benefit themselves, for example in the budget-maximizing model of bureaucracy, possibly at the cost of efficiency.

James Buchanan has suggested that public choice theory be interpreted as "politics without romance", a critical approach to a pervasive earlier notion of idealized politics set against market failure. Buchanan particularly emphasised the importance of fair rules and procedures in economic decision-making. This perspective suggests that government interventions should not only aim for fair outcomes but also ensure that the processes by which these outcomes are achieved are equitable and transparent.

Buchanan and Tullock's framework of constitutional decision-making divides decisions into two categories: constitutional decisions and political decisions. Constitutional decisions establish long-standing rules that rarely change and govern the political structure itself. Political decisions take place within and are governed by the structure. The book also focuses on positive-economic analysis of the development of constitutional democracy in an ethical context of consent. The consent takes the form of a compensation principle like Pareto efficiency for making a policy change and unanimity or at least no opposition as a point of departure for social choice.

=== Rational choice theory ===
Buchanan and Tullock outline methodological qualifications of the approach developed in their work The Calculus of Consent:

[E]ven if the model [with its rational self-interest assumptions] proves to be useful in explaining an important element of politics, it does not imply that all individuals act in accordance with the behavioral assumption made or that any one individual acts in this way at all times ... the theory of collective choice can explain only some undetermined fraction of collective action. However, so long as some part of all individual behavior ... is, in fact, motivated by utility maximization, and so long as the identification of the individual with the group does not extend to the point of making all individual utility functions identical, an economic-individualist model of political activity should be of some positive worth.

As for critiques concerning voter behavior, it is argued that public choice cannot explain why people vote due to limitations in rational choice theory. For example, from the viewpoint of rational choice theory, the expected gains of voting depend on (1) the benefit to the voter if their candidate wins and (2) the probability that one's vote will determine the election's outcome. Even in a tight election the probability that one's vote decides the outcome is estimated at effectively zero. This suggests that even if a voter expects gains from their candidate's success, the expected gains from voting are still near zero. When this is considered in combination with the multiple recognized costs of voting, such as the opportunity cost of foregone wages and transportation costs, a self-interested person is theoretically unlikely to vote at all.

Pressman is not alone in his critique; other prominent public choice economists, including Anthony Downs in An Economic Theory of Democracy, Morris P. Fiorina, and Gordon Tullock recognize that theorizing voting behavior is a major hurdle for the public choice approach.

=== Validity and efficacy ===
Steven Pressman offers a critique of the public choice approach, arguing that public choice fails to explain political behavior in a number of central areas, including politicians’ behavior and voting behavior. In the case of politicians' behavior, the public choice assumption that a politician's utility function is driven by greater political and economic power cannot account for various political phenomena. These include why politicians vote against their constituents' interests, why they advocate for higher taxation, fewer benefits, and smaller government, and why wealthy people seek office.

== Background and development ==
A 19th-century precursor of modern public choice theory was the work of Swedish economist Knut Wicksell, which treated government as political exchange, a quid pro quo, in formulating a benefit principle linking taxes and expenditures. American statesman and political theorist John C. Calhoun is also seen as a precursor to modern public choice theory. His writings on political economy anticipate the "public choice revolution" in modern economics and political science.

Modern public-choice theory, and especially election theory, has been dated to the work of Duncan Black, sometimes called "the founding father of public choice". In a series of papers from 1948, which culminated in The Theory of Committees and Elections (1958), Black outlined a program of unification toward a more general "Theory of Economic and Political Choices" based on common formal methods, developed underlying concepts of what became median voter theory, and rediscovered earlier work on voting theory. His work also included the possibility of entirely random outcomes in a voting structure, where the only determinant of an outcome is where a particular motion falls in a given sequence.

Kenneth J. Arrow's Social Choice and Individual Values (1951) influenced the theory of public choice and election theory. Building on Black's theory, Arrow concluded that in a non-dictatorial setting, no predictable outcome or preference order can be discerned for a set of possible distributions.

Among other important works are Anthony Downs's An Economic Theory of Democracy (1957) and Mancur Olson's The Logic of Collective Action (1965), which was fundamental in beginning the study of special interests. In it, Olson raises questions about the nature of groups. Concentrated groups' (such as farmers') incentive to act in their own interest paired with a lack of organization of large groups (such as the public as a whole) often results in legislation that benefits a small group rather than the general public.

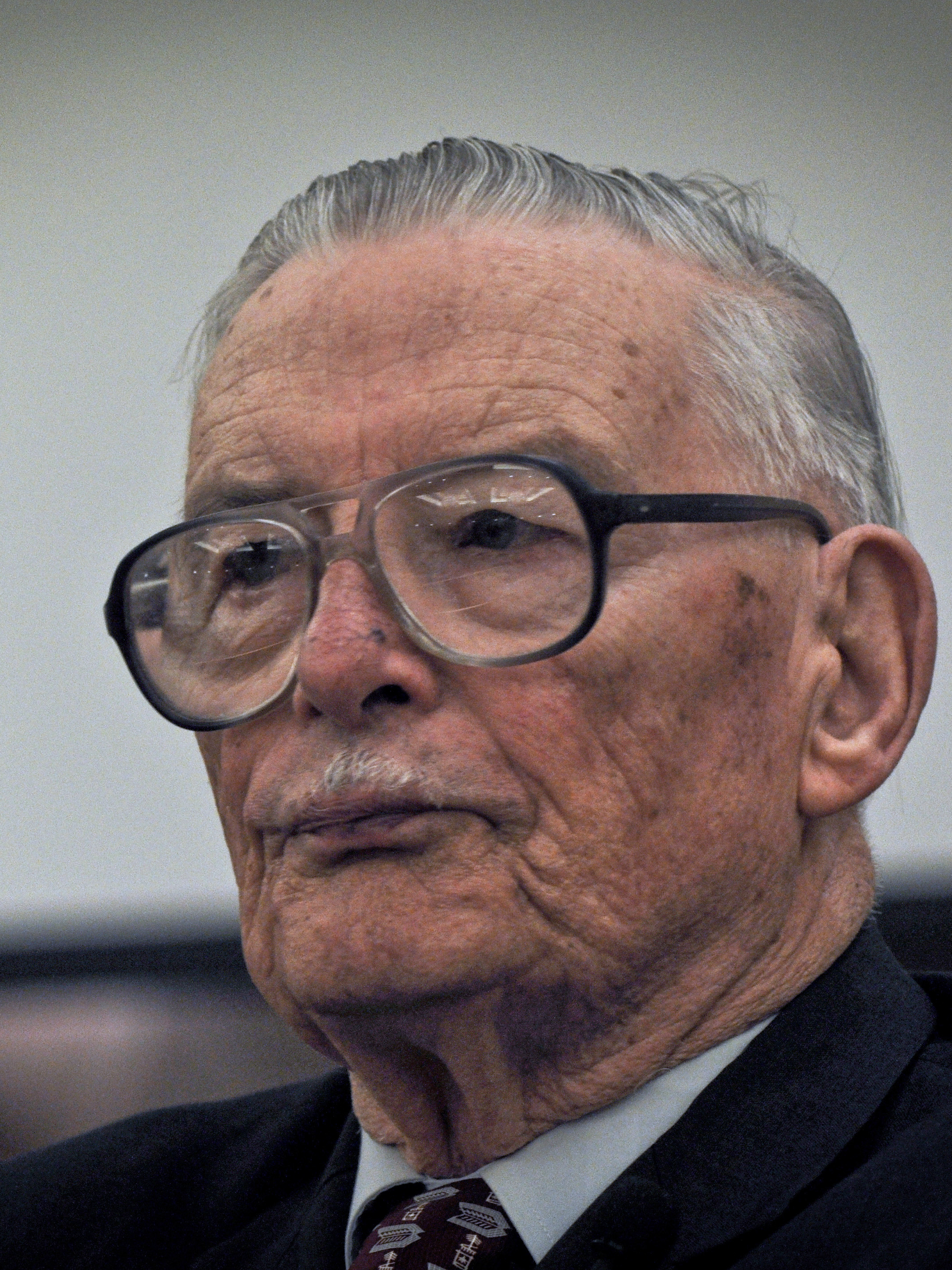
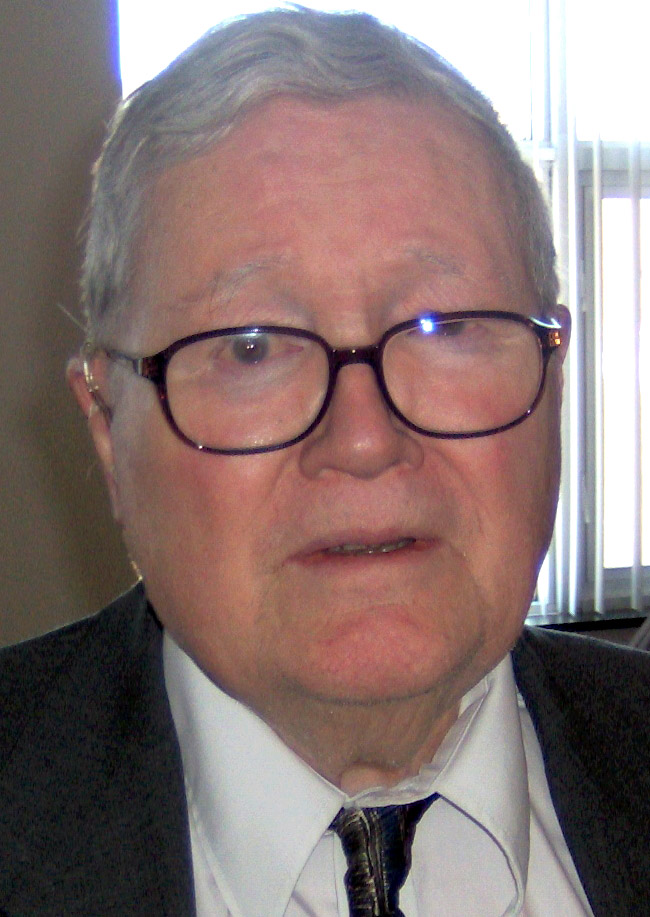
James M. Buchanan (left; 1919–2013) and Gordon Tullock (right; 1922–2014) coauthored The Calculus of Consent (1962)

James M. Buchanan and Gordon Tullock coauthored The Calculus of Consent: Logical Foundations of Constitutional Democracy (1962), considered one of the landmarks in public choice and constitutional economics. The book's preface says it is "about the political organization" of a free society. But its methodology, conceptual apparatus, and analytics "are derived, essentially, from the discipline that has as its subject the economic organization of such a society".

== Areas of study ==
In microeconomics, public choice analyses collective decision making and studies economic models of political processes including rent-seeking, elections, legislatures, and voting behavior.

=== Constitutional economics ===
Constitutional economics is a research program in political science and economics that applies economic theories, particularly those of public choice and political economy, to constitutional law. It is both a positive and normative program, which often aims to provide practical policy advice to public officials and politicians on constitutional matters.

The public-choice constitutional framework pioneered by James Buchanan and Gordon Tullock explains that for governmental activity to benefit everybody, agreement is required on the rules under which people interact, but not generally on every action government takes. For example, people might all agree that they benefit from paying taxes to finance roads, and might agree to delegate the decision of where to build those roads to some governmental authority. In some cases, citizens might be made worse off by the building (and financing) of some specific roads, but they would all agree they are better off with the government-financed roads than they would be without them. In keeping with the analogy to market exchange, optimal rules are rules to which everybody would agree.

Most of the literature in constitutional economics has dealt with the process by which constitutional rules are designed, and the types of rules that would result from those processes. To the extent that enforcement issues have been considered, the primary mechanism that appears in the public choice literature is democratic oversight of government actions. While voting models tend to point toward public policy being determined by the preferences of the electorate, the conclusion of much of the public choice literature is that democratic oversight is likely to be ineffective for a number of reasons. Rent-seeking, regulatory capture, and the undue influence of special interests all weigh against the idea that democratic oversight is an effective check on the abuse of government power.

=== Bureaucracy ===
Another major sub-field is the study of bureaucracy. The usual model depicts top bureaucrats as chosen by the chief executive and legislature, depending on whether the democratic system is presidential or parliamentary. The typical image of a bureau chief is someone on a fixed salary concerned with pleasing whoever appointed them. But most bureaucrats are civil servants whose jobs and pay are protected by a civil service system against major changes by their bureau chiefs. This image is often compared with that of a business owner whose profit varies with the success of production and sales, who aims to maximize profit, and who can in an ideal system hire and fire employees at will. William Niskanen is generally considered the founder of public choice literature on bureaucracy.

Public choice theories of bureaucracy may encompass empirical and anthropological studies of bureaucratic organisations of various levels and functions, including village councils, courts of law, and non-state welfare and humanitarian organisations.

=== Rent-seeking ===
Public choice theorists study rent-seeking behaviour through the lens of new political economy. Its basic thesis is that when both a market economy and government are present, government agents may rent or sell their influence to those who wish to influence lawmaking. The government agent stands to benefit from support from the party seeking influence, while that party seeks to benefit by implementing public policy that benefits them. This essentially results in the capture and reallocation of benefits, wasting the benefit and any resources used from being put to productive use in society. This is because the party attempting to acquire the benefit will spend up to or more than the benefit accrued, resulting in a zero-sum or a negative sum gain. The real gain is the gain over the competition. This political action will then be used to keep competition out of the market due to lack of real or political capital.

Rent-seeking is broader than public choice in that it applies to autocracies as well as democracies and therefore is not directly concerned with collective decision-making. But public choice theory must account for the obvious pressure rent-seeking exerts on legislators, executives, bureaucrats, and even judges when analyzing collective decision-making rules and institutions. Moreover, the members of a collective planning a government would be wise to take prospective rent-seeking into account.

Another major claim is that much political activity is a form of rent-seeking that wastes resources. Gordon Tullock, Jagdish Bhagwati, and Anne Osborn Krueger have argued that rent-seeking has caused considerable waste.

=== Democracy ===
According to Geoffrey Brennan and Loren Lomasky, democratic policy is biased to favor "expressive interests" and neglect practical and utilitarian considerations. Brennan and Lomasky distinguish between instrumental interests (any kind of practical benefit, monetary or non-monetary) and expressive interests (forms of expression like applause). According to them, the paradox of voting can be resolved by distinguishing between expressive and instrumental interests.

This argument has led some public choice scholars to claim that politics is plagued by irrationality. In articles in Econ Journal Watch, economist Bryan Caplan contended that voter choices and government economic decisions are inherently irrational. Caplan's ideas are more fully developed in his 2007 book The Myth of the Rational Voter. Countering Donald Wittman's arguments in The Myth of Democratic Failure, Caplan claims that politics is biased in favor of irrational beliefs.

According to Caplan, democracy effectively subsidizes irrational beliefs. Anyone who derives utility from potentially irrational policies like protectionism can receive private benefits while imposing the costs of such beliefs on the general public. If people bore the full costs of their "irrational beliefs" they would lobby for them optimally, taking into account both their instrumental consequences and their expressive appeal. Instead, democracy oversupplies policies based on irrational beliefs. Caplan defines rationality mainly in terms of mainstream price theory, arguing that mainstream economists oppose protectionism and government regulation more than the general population, and that more educated people are closer to economists on this score, even after controlling for confounding factors such as income, wealth or political affiliation. One criticism is that many economists do not share Caplan's views on the nature of public choice. But Caplan has data to support his position. Economists have in fact often been frustrated by public opposition to economic reasoning. As Sam Peltzman puts it:

Economists know what steps would improve the efficiency of HSE [health, safety, and environmental] regulation, and they have not been bashful advocates of them. These steps include substituting markets in property rights, such as emission rights, for command and control ... The real problem lies deeper than any lack of reform proposals or failure to press them. It is our inability to understand their lack of political appeal.

=== Special interest politics ===
Special interest groups are groups that are small in number relative to an area, but quite well organized and focused on a specific issue. A special interest group can pressure legislators to enact public policies that do not benefit society as a whole. Public choice theory is often used to explain how political decision-making results in outcomes that conflict with the general public's preferences, as a result of the impact of special interest groups. In particular, public choice theorists study phenomena such as regulatory capture, pork barrel spending, and logrolling. Theorists expect that numerous special interests will successfully lobby for various inefficient policies, resulting in government failure – a term akin to market failure from earlier theoretical welfare economics.

According to public choice theories, everyone involved has rational incentives to do exactly what they are doing, even though the general public desires the opposite outcome; costs are diffused while benefits are concentrated; thus, the voices of vocal minorities with much to gain are heard over those of indifferent majorities with little to individually lose. But the notion that groups with concentrated interests dominate politics is incomplete because it is only one half of political equilibrium. Something must incite those preyed upon to resist even the best-organized concentrated interests. In his article on interest groups, Gary Becker identifies this countervailing force as the deadweight loss from predation. His views cap what has come to be known as the Chicago school of political economy, which has come into conflict with the so-called Virginia faction of public choice due to the former's assertion that politics will tend toward efficiency due to nonlinear deadweight losses and its claim that political efficiency renders policy advice irrelevant.

== Concepts ==
=== Rational ignorance ===
Public choice economists suggest that the reason why a utility-maximizing person might rationally decide not to vote or not to become informed about the election may be explained by the theory of rational ignorance. Under this theory, a rational voter recognizes that one vote is extremely unlikely to make a difference, and they thus will not vote if the costs of becoming informed and voting are too high, or if they feel their vote will not be decisive. In An Economic Theory of Democracy, Anthony Downs argued:

It seems probable that for a great many citizens in a democracy, rational behavior excludes any investment whatever in political information per se. No matter how significant a difference between parties is revealed to the rational citizen by his free information, or how uncertain he is about which party to support, he realizes that his vote has almost no chance of influencing the outcome… He will not even utilize all the free information available, since assimilating it takes time.

Thus, Brennan and Lomasky's Democracy and Decision see “[t]he general thrust of the public choice literature on the turnout issue is to argue that the probability of being decisive is nothing like large enough to explain turnouts that are observed without appealing to something other than instrumental returns.” They then consider Nash equilibrium models that attempt to show how “substantial voter turnout may occur in a totally instrumental, outcome-oriented polity”. While Brennan and Lomasky “do not deny that some equilibria of this kind may exist in some cases—[they] believe the prospect unlikely. What [they] do deny is that the resulting equilibria much resemble those we observe in electoral practice”. What they broadly suggest is that expressive voting is the most reasonable explanation for why voting turnouts in large-participation elections are anywhere near as high as they are.

=== Voting models ===
The median voter theorem argues that politicians will try to match policies to what pleases the median voter preferences. However, the Condorcet Paradox highlights that that majority rule is inherently self contradictory by way of the situation in which Choice A is preferred by a majority over Choice B, Choice B is preferred by a majority over Choice C, and Choice C is preferred by a majority over Choice A . The Condorcet paradox means that there is not a clear winner and ambiguities must be resolved to determine the election results.

Voting models in public choice generally conclude that the collective choice of a group is determined by aggregating the votes of the individuals in the group. The implication is that the policy outcomes implemented by government are those chosen by the voters. The general conclusion held by public choice theorists is that political processes are unstable.

== See also ==
- Abilene paradox – False consensus due to communication failure
- Choice modelling – Method for analyzing revealed preferences
- Economics empiricism – Social science studying goods and services
- Fiscal illusion – Failure to accurately perceive the amount of government expenditure
- Flipism – Practice or personal philosophy in which all decisions are made by flipping a coin
- Flypaper effect – Grant municipality increase level of public spending more than income of equivalent size
- Free-rider problem – Market failure benefitting non-paying users
- Political economy – Study of the development of social production
- New institutional economics – Economic perspective
- Prisoner's dilemma – Standard example in game theory
- Rational choice theory – Class of models in the behavioral sciences
- Realpolitik – Approach in diplomacy and politics
- Regulatory capture – Form of political corruption
- Sortition – Selection of decision-makers by random sample
- Socialist calculation debate – Discourse on the applicability of central planning without capital markets
- Subsidiarity – Principle of social organization
- Tax choice – Participatory tax allocation process
- Political expressive behaviour – Political action taken to express identity

== Bibliography ==
- Arrow, Kenneth J. (1951, 2nd ed., 1963). Social Choice and Individual Values
- Black, Duncan (1958). The Theory of Committees and Elections. Cambridge: Cambridge University Press.
- Buchanan, James M. (1967). Public Finance in Democratic Process: Fiscal Institutions and Individual Choice, UNC Press. Description, scrollable preview, back cover
  - _____ (1968). The Demand and Supply of Public Goods. Rand McNally.
  - _____ (1986). "The Constitution of Economic Policy, Nobel Prize lecture. Republished in 1987, American Economic Review, 77(3), pp. 243–250. JSTOR 1804093
  - _____ (2003). "Public Choice: The Origins and Development of a Research Program", Center for Study of Public Choice at George Mason University, Fairfax: Virginia.
  - _____, and Gordon Tullock (1962). The Calculus of Consent. Ann Arbor: University of Michigan Press.
- Buchanan, James M. and Richard A. Musgrave (1999). Public Finance and Public Choice: Two Contrasting Visions of the State, MIT Press. Description and scrollable preview links.
- Downs, Anthony. (1957). An Economic Theory of Democracy. Cambridge: York: Cambridge University Press.
- Hansjürgens, Bernd – The influence of Knut Wicksell on Richard Musgrave and James Buchanan
- Holcombe, R. G. (1989). "The Median Voter Model in Public Choice Theory", Public Choice 61, 115–125
- McKelvey, R. D. (1976). "Intransitivities in Multi Dimensional Voting Models and some Implications for Agenda Control", Journal of Economic Theory 12(3) 472–482
- MacKenzie, D. W. (2008). The Use of Knowledge about Society. Journal of Economic Behavior and Organization.
  - _____ (2008). Politics and Knowledge: Expectations formation in Democracy. Working paper, Presented at the Southern Economics Association Conference in 2005.
- Mueller, Dennis C. (1976). "Public Choice: A Survey", Journal of Economic Literature, 14(2), pp. 395–433.
  - _____ (2003). Public Choice III. Cambridge: Cambridge University Press. Description and preview.
- Niskanen, William A. (1987). "Bureaucracy". In Charles K. Rowley, ed. Democracy and Public Choice. Oxford: Basil Blackwell.
- Olson, Mancur, Jr. (1965, 2nd ed., 1971). The Logic of Collective Action. Cambridge: Harvard University Press.
- Ostrom, Elinor (1990). Governing the Commons The Evolution of Institutions for Collective Action. Cambridge University Press. Description and preview links. ISBN 9780521405997.
  - _____ (2010). "Beyond Markets and States: Polycentric Governance of Complex Economic Systems", American Economic Review, 100(3), pp. 641–672.
- Ostrom, Vincent (1986). The Theory of the Compound Republic. Lincoln, Nebraska: University of Nebraska Press. Second edition.
- Palda, Filip (2016). A Better Kind of Violence: The Chicago School of Political Economy, Public Choice, and The Quest for an Ultimate Theory of Power. Cooper-Wolfling Press.
- Riker, William H. (1962). The Theory of Political Coalitions. New Haven and London: Yale University Press.
- Romer, T. & Rosenthal, H. (1979). "The Elusive Median Voter", Journal of Public Economics 12(2) 143–170
- Rowley, Charles K., and Friedrich Schneider, ed. (2004). The Encyclopedia of Public Choice, 2 v. Springer. Description, v. 1, chapter abstract and preview links, and review JSTOR 30026602
  - _____ and _____, eds. (2008). Readings in Public Choice and Constitutional Political Economy, Springer. Description and chapter-preview links.
  - _____ and Laura Razzolini, eds. (2001). The Elgar Companion to Public Choice. Northampton, Mass.: Edward Elgar, Description.
- Wicksell, Knut ([1896] 1958). "A New Principle of Just Taxation", trans. J.M. Buchanan, in Richard A. Musgrave and Alan T. Peacock, ed., Classics in the Theory of Public Finance, Palgrave Macmillan.
- This article incorporates text from a free content work. Licensed under CC BY 4.0. Text taken from Introduction to Public Economy | Principles of Economics 2e, Steven A. Greenlaw, David Shapiro, Boundless. OpenStax.
- This article incorporates text from a free content work. Licensed under CC BY-SA 4.0. Text taken from 15.1: Sources of Inefficiency | Economics, Boundless. LibreTexts.
- This article incorporates text from a free content work. Licensed under CC BY 4.0. Text taken from Economic Policy Analysis Playbook 2e, Leonie J. Pearson, University of Canberra. University of Canberra.
- This article incorporates text from a free content work. Licensed under CC BY 4.0. Text taken from Economies, MDPI. Econstor.
