= The Logic of Collective Action =

Book by Mancur Olson

The Logic of Collective Action: Public Goods and the Theory of Groups
- Author: Mancur Olson
- Language: English
- Publication date: 1965

The Logic of Collective Action: Public Goods and the Theory of Groups is a book by Mancur Olson Jr. published in 1965. It develops a theory of political science and economics of concentrated benefits versus diffuse costs. Its central argument is that concentrated minor interests will be overrepresented and diffuse majority interests trumped, due to a free-rider problem that is stronger when a group becomes larger.

== Overview ==
The book challenged the propositions that (i) if everyone in a group (of any size) has interests in common, then they will act collectively to achieve them; and (ii) in a democracy, the greatest concern is that the majority will tyrannize and exploit the minority. It argues instead that individuals in any group attempting collective action will have incentives to "free ride" on the efforts of others if the group is working to provide public goods. Without selective incentives to motivate active participation, collective action is unlikely to occur even when large groups of people with common interests exist.

The book notes that large groups will face relatively high costs when attempting to organize for collective action while small groups will face relatively low costs, and individuals in large groups will gain marginally less per capita. Hence, in the absence of selective incentives, the incentive for group action diminishes as group size increases, so that large groups are less able to act in their common interest than small ones.

The book concludes that, not only is collective action by large groups difficult to achieve even when they have interests in common, but situations could occur where the minority (bound together by concentrated selective incentives) can dominate the majority.

== Critique ==
Olson's original logic of collective action has been critiqued from several perspectives.

=== Information asymmetry ===
Susanne Lohmann supports the observations of Olson in observing the economic puzzle of general welfare losses occurring in favour of smaller minority benefits, noting that the U.S. quota on sugar imports generated 2,261 jobs while reducing overall welfare by $1.162 billion, such the implicit cost per job exceeded $500,000, a highly Pareto-inefficient outcome. She further notes that a political puzzle arises when minority interests override majority preferences, as in the rural bias of agricultural subsidies, such as the Common Agricultural Policy in the European Union.

Lohmann argues that Olson’s explanation based on the free-rider problem is insufficient. Instead, she attributes these outcomes to information asymmetry. When agents evaluate political actors, they place greater weight on how well their own specific interests are represented rather than on broader welfare gains. Thus, it may be politically rational for politicians to privilege narrow interests at the expense of general benefits.

=== Legitimacy ===
Gunnar Trumbull challenges Olson’s and Lohmann’s claim that concentrated interests dominate public policy, highlighting that diffuse interests, such as those of retirees, patients, or consumers, have historically secured representation. Trumbull states that diffuse interests can enjoy a "legitimacy premium" when they mobilize, while concentrated interests often face skepticism. He introduces the idea of "legitimacy coalitions," where state policymakers, social activists, and industry actors form alliances to promote policies. Such coalitions broaden representation, as seen in the post-war neo-corporatist system.

=== Critical mass ===
Gerald Marwell and Pamela Oliver use mathematical and computational models to argue that some of Olson’s assumptions are unrealistic. For instance, he assumes a linear “production function” for goods. If the function accelerates instead, a critical mass of early contributors can stimulate wider participation. Olson also assumes that the cost of a good depends on group size. Marwell and Oliver contend that for many public goods, costs are not structured this way, and larger groups are more likely to include individuals for whom it is rational to provide the good, wholly or in part.

=== Cost–benefit distribution ===
James Q. Wilson argues that Olson’s model does not cover all political arrangements and therefore cannot fully explain collective action. He contends that Olson’s framework primarily describes cases with diffuse costs and concentrated benefits, and overlooks other political arrangements where costs and benefits may be distributed differently.

== See also ==
- Bystander effect
- Constitutional economics
- Deindividuation
- Diffusion of responsibility
- Groupshift
- Tragedy of the commons
