= Public Choice (journal) =

Academic journal

- Discipline: Political science, economics
- Language: English
- Edited by: Peter T. Leeson

Publication details
- Former name: Papers on Non-Market Decision Making
- History: 1966-present
- Publisher: Springer Science+Business Media (United States)
- Frequency: 8/year
- Impact factor: 2.400 (2026)

Standard abbreviations
- ISO 4: Public Choice

Indexing
- ISSN: 0048-5829 (print); 1573-7101 (web)
- LCCN: sf77000157
- JSTOR: 00485829
- OCLC no.: 38267255

Links
- Journal homepage; Online archive; Papers on Non-Market Decision Making archive

Public Choice is a peer-reviewed academic journal covering the intersection of economics and political science. It was established in 1966 as Papers on Non-Market Decision Making, obtaining its current name in 1968. It is published eight times per year by Springer Science+Business Media and the editor-in-chief is Peter T. Leeson (George Mason University).

According to the Journal Citation Reports, its 2026 impact factor is 2.400, ranking it 85 out of 325 journals in the category "Political Science".

== See also ==
- List of political science journals
