= The Calculus of Consent =

Book by James M. Buchanan and Gordon Tullock

The Calculus of Consent: Logical Foundations of Constitutional Democracy
- Author: James M. Buchanan, Gordon Tullock
- Genre: Economics
- Publication date: 1962

The Calculus of Consent: Logical Foundations of Constitutional Democracy is a book published by economists James M. Buchanan and Gordon Tullock in 1962. It is considered to be one of the classic works from the discipline of public choice in economics and political science. This work presents the basic principles of public choice theory.

== Overview ==
The book applies the methods of economics to collective decision-making, treating political outcomes as the result of choices made by self-interested politicians and bureaucrats rather than by an organic state making decisions in public interest. The authors adopt methodological individualism, holding that collective action is composed of individual actions and that the value of an institution lies in how well it serves the individuals subject to it. In this view, the "public interest" is not separate from individual decision-makers, but a collection of self-interested choices made by them.

Buchanan and Tullock rejected any organic interpretation of the state. The central theme of the book revolves around the idea that politics is a form of exchange, in which individuals trade votes and support similar to how they exchange goods and services. The authors distinguish two levels of choices: a constitutional stage, at which the rules of collective decision-making are selected, and an operational stage, at which the decisions are made.

A purely individualistic conception of collectivity is maintained: the state is an artifact, created by men and thus subject to change and perfection. Buchanan and Tullock maintain that only constitutional changes, which can be shown to be in the interest of all interested parties, can be judged as "improvements" and therefore consider conceptual unanimity as the only legitimate decision-making rule.

The authors analyze the traditional political-science approach to voting systems, including majority voting as the standard as opposed to the unanimity rule. They show that none of those systems is perfect, since there is always a tradeoff:

- a simple majority-based system imposes varying amounts of both external costs and decision-making costs
- a unanimity-based system has little or no external costs, but considerable decision-making costs.

Buchanan and Tullock conclude that decisions with potentially high external costs should require unanimity - or at least supermajority systems.

While many political scientists define the political process as a system in which the policy decisions are viewed as a struggle between private interest and public interest, Buchanan and Tullock suggest that the public interest is simply the aggregation of private decision-makers.

They show that in classical political-science theory, the "public interest" is always the correct choice with the same appeal to all voters, which may or may not be opposed by "special interests". But that theory ignores the fact that most choices appeal to many different "law consumers" with varying strengths. An illustrative example is a choice whether to increase funding for health care. Some voters will strongly support or oppose it, but many may not care at all.

They compare this to a market transaction, where the voters strongly desiring better health-care could purchase the acceptance of the opposition and uninterested voters with concessions, resulting in an efficient allocation of resources, increasing the happiness of all parties (Pareto optimality). However, the equivalent of this in the political realm is that politicians buy the votes of other politicians (or groups of special interest) by promising to vote for their issues. In the authors' opinion such log-rolling is to be expected, but in the traditional political-science theory, it is anomalous. Thus, their model explains certain things that the previous models of politics could not.

Employing the theoretical concepts of game theory and Pareto optimality, Buchanan and Tullock show that symmetry in benefits-sharing may be at most a necessary, but never a sufficient condition for the attainment of a Pareto-optimal position. The introduction of side payments is the crucial element, which would lead to optimality. In a sense the introduction of side payments creates marketable property-rights of the individual political vote (Chapter 12).

== Reception ==
The book is widely regarded as a founding text of public-choice and of constitutional political economy. The framing of politics as exchange the analysis of voting rules influenced subsequent works on decision-making rules, legislative institutions, and preference revelation. Buchanan received the 1986 Nobel Prize in Economic Sciences “for his development of the contractual and constitutional bases for the theory of economic and political decision-making.”

== Table of contents ==
Part I. The Conceptual Framework

- 1. Introduction
- 2. The Individualistic Postulate (includes topics such as methodological individualism)
- 3. Politics and the Economic Nexus
- 4. Individual Rationality in Social Choice (includes topics such as Rational choice theory and Social choice)

Part II. The Realm of Social Choice

- 5. The Organization of Human Activity
- 6. A Generalized Economic Theory of Constitutions (includes topics such as Constitutional economics)
- 7. The Rule of Unanimity (includes topics such as Unanimity)
- 8. The Costs of Decision-Making

Part III. Analyses of Decision-Making Rules

- 9. The Structure of the Models
- 10. Simple Majority Voting (includes topics such as Simple Majority Voting)
- 11. Simple Majority Voting and the Theory of Games (includes topics such as game theory)
- 12. Majority Rule, Game Theory, and Pareto Optimality (includes topics such as majority rule and Pareto optimality)
- 13. Pareto Optimality, External Costs, and Income Redistribution (includes topics such as Pareto optimality and income redistribution)
- 14. The Range and Extent of Collective action (includes topics such as Collective action)
- 15. Qualified Majority Voting Rules, Representation, and the Interdependence of Constitutional Variables (includes topics such as Qualified Majority Voting and Political representation)
- 16. The Bicameral Legislature (Bicameralism)
- 17. The Orthodox Model of Majority Rule (includes topics such as Majority rule)

Part IV. The Economics and the Ethics of Democracy

- 18. Democracy, Ethics, and Economic Efficiency (includes topics such as Democracy, Ethics, and Economic efficiency)
- 19. Pressure groups, Special interests, and the Constitution (includes topics such as Advocacy group, Lobby group, and the Constitution)
- 20. The Politics of the Good Society
- Appendix 1 Marginal Notes on Reading Political Philosophy (Political philosophy)
- Appendix 2 Theoretical Forerunners
