= Anthony Downs =

American economist (1930–2021)

- Born: November 21, 1930; Evanston, Illinois, U.S.
- Died: October 2, 2021 (aged 90); Bethesda, Maryland, U.S.

Academic background
- Education: Carleton College (BA); Stanford University (MA, PhD)
- Influences: Joseph Schumpeter; Kenneth J. Arrow

Academic work
- Discipline: Public economics Political sciences
- School or tradition: Public Choice school
- Institutions: Brookings Institution

James Anthony Downs (November 21, 1930 – October 2, 2021) was an American economist specializing in public policy and public administration. His research focuses included political choice theory, rent control, affordable housing, and transportation economics. He wrote a number of books including, An Economic Theory of Democracy (1957) and Inside Bureaucracy (1967), which have been major influences on the public choice school of political economy. In Downs's Law of Peak-Hour Traffic Congestion (1962), he predicted that expanding expressways could not reduce traffic congestion, since demand would increase as well, and that reducing speeds increases capacity.

He served as a senior fellow at the Brookings Institution in Washington, D.C., member of faculty at the University of Chicago and a visiting fellow at the Public Policy Institute of California in San Francisco. Downs was also an elected fellow of the National Academy of Public Administration.

== Early life ==
James Anthony Downs was born on November 21, 1930, in Evanston, Illinois. His father was the founder of a consulting firm, Real Estate Research Corporation, and a frequent speaker on real estate related topics. He grew up in Park Ridge, Illinois, a suburb of Chicago.

He received a B.A. in international relations and political theory from Carleton College in 1952. During this time he was the elected president of the college student body. He would later credit this experience for some of his interests in studying democracy. He went to the Graduate School of Business at Stanford University on a scholarship to pursue his M.A. and Ph.D. in economics, obtaining his doctorate in 1956.

He enlisted in the Navy and served as an intelligence officer when he was drafted. During this time he also served on an aircraft carrier in the Mediterranean Sea. He quit the service after three years to join his father's consulting firm and also briefly served as a member of the faculty at the University of Chicago.

== Career ==
Downs served as a consultant to many of the nation's largest corporations and public institutions, including the U.S. Department of Housing and Urban Development (HUD) and the White House. President Lyndon B. Johnson appointed him to the National Commission on Urban Problems in 1967, and HUD Secretary Jack Kemp appointed him to the Advisory Commission on Regulatory Barriers to Affordable Housing in 1989. He was an officer or trustee of the NAACP Legal Defense and Educational Fund.

=== Democracy and the left–right continuum ===
In his seminal work, An Economic Theory of Democracy (1957), Downs introduced a left–right axis to economic theory. On the "left" he placed communist parties that want entirely state-planned economies, and on the "right" he placed conservative parties that demand an entirely deregulated economy.

He claimed that most voters have incomplete information when voting for political candidates in a democracy, and therefore will resort to economic issues of "how much government intervention in the economy there should be" and how parties will control this. Downs borrowed the curve from Harold Hotelling, who developed it to explain how grocery stores targeted customers. Downs's book has since become one of the most cited books in political science. His left–right axis model has been integrated into the median voter theory first articulated by Duncan Black.

In An Economic Theory of Democracy (1957), an early work in rational choice theory, Downs posited the paradox of voting, which claimed that significant elements of political life could not be explained in terms of voter self-interest. Downs showed that in democracies the aggregate distribution of political opinion forms a bell-shaped curve, with most voters possessing moderate opinions; he argued that this fact forces political parties in democracies to adopt centrist positions.

=== Housing and traffic policy ===
Later, Downs concerned himself with housing policy, writing about rent control and affordable housing. The Revolution in Real Estate Finance (1985) predicted a long-term housing slowdown and decrease in housing prices. Downs had involved himself with transportation economics.

In 1962, Downs published his Downs's Law of Peak-Hour Traffic Congestion. This law states that on urban commuter expressways, peak-hour traffic congestion rises to meet maximum capacity. Therefore, expanding the expressway network does not help against traffic jams. A complex set of forces lie behind this law, which were analyzed by presentation of a model of commuter decision-making and its underlying set of assumptions. Sometimes this effect is referred to as Induced demand. By the same token, e.g. the 1965 Highway Capacity Manual stated that the capacity of a highway or motorway increases with decreasing traffic speed, until its maximum capacity is reached at about 50 km/h (30 mph). (Cf. Braess's paradox.)

His book, Stuck in Traffic (1992), which detailed the economic disadvantages of traffic congestion and proposed road pricing as the only effective means of alleviating it, was denounced by traffic engineers for its insistence on the futility of congestion relief measures. However, enough of his predictions about congestion were proven correct that he successfully published a second edition, Still Stuck in Traffic (2004).

Downs's recommendations have started to see implementation, largely in the form of high-occupancy toll (HOT) lanes in the medians of crowded American freeways, and through congestion pricing, already implemented in several cities around the world: Singapore (see Area Licensing Scheme and Electronic Road Pricing); London (see London congestion charge); Stockholm (see Stockholm congestion tax); Valletta, Milan, and New York

He joined the Brookings Institution, an American thinktank, in 1977. He continued his work on housing policies and traffic issues management at the institute.

He was the author or co-author of 24 books and more than 500 articles. His most influential books are An Economic Theory of Democracy (1957) and Inside Bureaucracy (1967); widely translated, both are credited as major influences on the public choice school of political economy.

He was a visiting fellow at the Public Policy Institute of California in San Francisco, between 2004 and 2005.

== Personal life ==
Downs met his first wife, Mary Katherine Watson, at a high-school prom. During this time, he challenged her to a game of chess, which she won. The couple were married in 1956. They had five children. Kay died in 1998 from ovarian cancer. Downs later married his second wife Darian Dreyfuss Olsen.

Anthony Downs died of natural causes in Bethesda, Maryland, on October 2, 2021.

== See also ==
- Rational choice theory
- Rational ignorance
- Induced demand
