= The Myth of the Rational Voter =

2007 book by Bryan Caplan

- Cover of the first edition
- Author: Bryan Caplan
- Language: English
- Subject: Democracy
- Publisher: Princeton University Press
- Publication date: 2007
- Publication place: United States
- Media type: Print (hardback)
- Pages: 276 (2007 edition)
- ISBN: 978-0-691-12942-6 (2007 edition, hbk)
- OCLC: 71581737
- Dewey Decimal: 320.6 22
- LC Class: HD87 .C36 2007

The Myth of the Rational Voter: Why Democracies Choose Bad Policies is a 2007 book by the economist Bryan Caplan, in which the author challenges the idea that voters are reasonable people whom society can trust to make laws. Rather, Caplan contends that voters are irrational in the political sphere and have systematically biased ideas concerning economics.

== Summary ==
Throughout the book, Caplan focuses on voters' opinion of economics since so many political decisions revolve around economic issues (immigration, trade, welfare, economic growth, and so forth). Using data from the Survey of Americans and Economists on the Economy (SAEE), Caplan categorizes the roots of economic errors into four biases: anti-market, anti-foreign, make-work, and pessimistic.

=== Anti-market bias ===
Caplan refers to the anti-market bias as a "tendency to underestimate the benefits of the market mechanism." People tend to view themselves as victims of the market, rather than as participants in it, according to Caplan. He also categorises a few major misconceptions associated with this bias: (1) a view that market payments are transfers rather than incentives, (2) a belief in a monopoly theory of price, where firms impose prices on consumers without recourse.

In the first, he describes that "people tend to see profits as a gift to the rich" and that "limiting profits" permits pity to the poor. However, profits are seen by economists as means to promote trade in those sectors. Moreover, the historical attacks on usury and windfalls see interest as robbing the borrower. Yet, interest is in fact two things: the creditor delaying his own consumption for compensation (known as liquidity preference) and compensation for the risk of borrower defaults.

The second is where corporations, even small-scale suppliers, are seen as greedy monopolists that prey on the consumer. Caplan argues that all trade is a two-way street and that people like middlemen are not interposers attempting to fleece the people, but rather, making up for transportation, storage, and distribution costs. At a more broad level, cheating people is bad for business and the existence of multiple firms offering similar products implies competition, not monopoly power, which limits any firm's ability to increase prices.

=== Anti-foreign bias ===
Caplan refers to the anti-foreign bias as a "tendency to underestimate the economic benefits of interaction with foreigners." People systematically see their country of origin as in competition with other nations and so oppose free trade with them. Foreigners are seen as the "enemy" even if the two governments are at a lasting peace. The principles of comparative advantage allow two countries to benefit a great deal from trade, even if one is worse than the other in every single way. The degree of benefit is rarely equalized, but it is always positive for both parties. Caplan also notes how the anti-foreign bias can be rooted in pseudo-racist attitudes. For Americans, trading with Japan and Mexico is more controversial than trading with Canada and England, which are more linguistically and ethnically similar to the United States.

=== Make-work bias ===
Caplan refers to the make-work bias as a "tendency to underestimate the economic benefits from conserving labor." Caplan claims that there is a tendency to equate economic growth with job creation. However, that is not necessarily true, since real economic growth is a product of increases in the productivity of labor. Dislocation and unemployment can be caused by productivity gains making certain jobs no longer necessary. All things being equal, economic rationality would require that these people make use of their talents elsewhere. Caplan makes special emphasis of the movement away from farming over the past 200 years, from nearly 95% of Americans as farmers in 1800 to just 3% in 1999, as an illustrative example. As an economy industrialises, increased labor productivity in agriculture means less labor is needed to produce a given quantity of agricultural goods, freeing up labour (a scarce resource) to be employed in the production of "other" (than agricultural) goods and services. Those other marketable "things of value" might include manufactured goods, but they could instead take other forms, e.g. intellectual property (such as advice, or compiled data).

=== Pessimistic bias ===
Caplan refers to the pessimistic bias as a "tendency to overestimate the severity of economic problems and underestimate the (recent) past, present, and future performance of the economy." The public generally perceives economic conditions as declining or about to decline. Caplan alleges that there is often little or no evidence to back up such perceptions of imminent apocalypse. Among challengers Caplan cites is Julian Lincoln Simon and his book, The Ultimate Resource, which argues society continues to progress despite claims of environmental degradation and an increasing use of natural resources.

== Survey of Americans and Economists on the Economy ==
The author pays special attention to the 1996 Survey of Americans and Economists on the Economy (SAEE), created by The Washington Post, the Kaiser Family Foundation, and Harvard University Survey Project. The SAEE asked 1,510 random members of the American public and 250 people with PhDs in economics the same questions concerning the economy. In addition to its 37 topical questions, the SAEE also inquired about the participant's income, income growth, education, and other demographic information.

The answers to the questions are often different: the public often blames technology, outsourcing, high corporate profits, and downsizing as reasons for why growth is lower than it could be. Economists, on the other hand, barely pay any heed to such arguments. Some 74% of the public blame greedy oil companies for high gas prices, but only 11% of economists do. The public tends to believe real incomes are decreasing while economists take the opposite stance.

Caplan notes that the chasm between economists and the general public might arguably be due to bias on the expert's part. Self-serving bias (economists are rich and so they believe whatever benefits them) and ideological assumptions (economists are a bunch of right-wing ideologues) are two challenges the author addresses. Caplan writes: "Both the self-serving bias and the ideological bias are, in principle, empirically testable. Economists' views are the product of their affluence? Then rich economists and rich noneconomists should agree. Economists are blinded by conservative ideology? Then conservative economists and conservative noneconomists should agree." In turn, if self-serving bias is unavoidable, it would likewise skew the perceptions of the non-wealthy, causing them to believe both the "'ought' claim" that government should reduce inequality of wealth and the "'is' claims" that existing inequalities of outcome are severe and are perpetuated by corporate and governmental power structures.

Using data from the SAEE (which includes measures for ideology, income, job security, and other measures), Caplan simulates what people would believe if they had the same circumstances as economists, a technique often used in political science called "enlightened preferences". If the ideological and self-serving biases are true, most of the difference between the "enlightened public" and economists should disappear. If, however, the enlightened public is not much closer to economists, then something else is going on, as those explanations have been neutralized. Caplan believes that the something else is the biases he enumerated earlier. The data tend to support Caplan's argument, with most (but not all) of the enlightened public closer to economists than to the public.

== Rational irrationality ==
In standard neoclassical economics, people are assumed to be rational; the notion of systematic bias is considered to be a sloppy assumption. In many ways, Caplan agrees: most people are rational when it comes to choosing a job, buying milk, hiring employees, and selecting a business strategy. They can be wrong, of course, but a systematic bias rarely, if ever, occurs.

But the author argues they are rational only because it is costly to be wrong. A racist will still hire a qualified black person because going to the second-best option will be expensive to the company. A protectionist will still outsource because he has to achieve as many advantages over his competitors as he can to stay in business. Someone who thinks a discount store is haunted will seriously question their conclusions when they find their budget to be tight.

Sometimes, however, it is virtually costless for the individual person to hold on to their preconceived beliefs, and people enjoy such beliefs. Rational irrationality simply states that when it is cheap to believe something (even when it is wrong) it is rational to believe it. They refuse to retrace their logic and seriously ask themselves if what they believe is true. For some people, thinking hurts and so they avoid it if they can. This often appears in politics. Caplan argues that, "Since delusional political beliefs are free, the voter consumes until he reaches his 'satiation point,' believing whatever makes him feel best. When a person puts on his voting hat, he does not have to give up practical efficacy in exchange for self-image because he has no practical efficacy to give up in the first place."

=== Relation to public choice theory ===
The book is notable in its use of irrationality, a rare assumption in economics. Yet the work is also a challenge to conventional public choice, where voters are seen as rationally ignorant. Conventional public choice either emphasizes the efficiency of democracy (as in the case of Donald Wittman) or, more commonly, democratic failure because of the interaction between self-interested politicians or bureaucrats, well-organized, rent-seeking special interests and a largely indifferent general public (as in the work of Gordon Tullock, James M. Buchanan, and many others).

Caplan, however, emphasizes that democratic failure exists and places the blame for it squarely on the general public. He makes special emphasis that politicians are often caught between a rock and a hard place: thanks to advisors, they know what policies would be generally beneficial, but they also know that those policies are not what people want. Thus, they are balancing good economic policy, so they do not get voted out of office because of slow growth, and bad economic policy, so they do not get voted out of office because of unpopular policies.

== Reception ==
=== Popular press ===
The book was reviewed in the popular press, including in The Wall Street Journal, The New York Times, and the New Yorker. It was also briefly mentioned in Time Magazine. Nicholas Kristof wrote in The New York Times that it was the "best political book of this year."

=== Academic press ===
The book received a mixed-to-positive review from Loren Lomasky in Public Choice, co-inventor of the theory of "expressive voting" that was a close competitor to Caplan's theory of rational irrationality. Stuart Farrand wrote a critique of Caplan's book for Libertarian Papers. Gene Callahan reviewed the book for The Independent Review. Prema Popat of Northeastern University and Benjamin Powell of Suffolk University jointly wrote a review of the book for New Perspectives on Political Economy.

Prior to publication of the book, Caplan had put forward the main thesis of the book as the lead essay in the November 2006 issue of Cato Unbound. Other participants in the debate, who critiqued various aspects of Caplan's thesis, included David Estlund, Loren Lomasky, and Jeffrey Friedman.

The book received a mixed review from the libertarian Austrian economist Walter Block in the Journal of Libertarian Studies. Block was highly critical of Caplan's attempts to paint Austrian economics as a form of irrational free-market extremism. He also criticized Caplan for not referencing Hans-Hermann Hoppe's book Democracy: The God That Failed that had a similar theme. Block's review was also published in LewRockwell.com and Psychology Today.

== Related books ==
=== Books published earlier ===
- Democracy and Decision by Geoffrey Brennan and Loren Lomasky, where the authors describe their "expressive voting" thesis in detail. Caplan's theory of rational irrationality is a close competitor to the theory offered here, and is in many ways similar. Lomasky wrote a review of Caplan's book.
- The Myth of Democratic Failure by Donald Wittman, the book that Caplan says was the impetus for writing his own book. Caplan included Wittman's book on his reading list, writing "This is the book that awoke me from my dogmatic public choice slumbers—and (negatively) inspired all of my work on voter irrationality. It's a gift." Caplan and Wittman participated in a public debate shortly after Caplan's book was released.

=== Books published later ===
- The Ethics of Voting by Jason Brennan, a 2011 book examining whether people have a moral obligation to vote. Brennan argued that people are not morally obliged to vote, but that if they do vote, they are obliged to vote responsibly. He argued that people who are not confident that they can vote well should refrain from voting. The final chapter of Brennan's book reviewed the evidence regarding whether people are generally well-qualified to make responsible voting decisions, and this chapter referenced The Myth of the Rational Voter.
- Against Democracy by Jason Brennan, a 2016 Princeton University Press book that challenges the belief that democracy is good and moral, and argues that the system does not produce good enough results. Furthermore, Brennan presents and defends different alternatives of "the rule of the knowledgeable" (epistocracy), where only the most knowledgeable voters get to elect the leaders. Caplan has endorsed the book.

== See also ==
- Behavioral economics
- Criticism of democracy
- Democracy: The God That Failed—2001 book by Hans-Hermann Hoppe
