= The Ethics of Voting =

2011 book by Jason Brennan

- Author: Jason Brennan
- Language: English
- Subject: Political philosophy
- Publisher: Princeton University Press
- Publication date: 2011
- Publication place: United States
- Media type: Print
- Pages: 216
- ISBN: 978-0691144818 (first edition, Hardcover)
- OCLC: 679940643
- Dewey Decimal: 172.1
- LC Class: JF1001.B742

The Ethics of Voting by Jason Brennan is a book which outlines a contrasting argument to the idea that it is the civic duty of individuals within a democracy to vote. The core tenet upon which his argument resides is that the individuals who do not know what they are voting for should not feel the moral obligation to vote on issues about which they are uninformed, and that democracies would benefit as a whole from their abstaining from the polls.

== Topics ==
In addition to the recurring theme that uninformed voting is worse than nonvoting, Brennan discusses the negative effects of voter negligence, or religious motivations for individuals to vote. Also included is a chapter on the morality of vote buying and why Brennan argues it is justifiable under certain circumstances. And the morality for the "Lesser of two evils" Justification. In the paperback edition there is also an afterword by Brennan titled "How to Vote Well".

== Reception ==
While the book was widely well received as a new way of considering one's civic duty, there have been criticisms of his work. Chad Flanders' review of The Ethics of Voting in the Notre Dame Philosophical Reviews praises the book as a whole but also states that Brennan seems to enjoy being contrarian a little too much. However, Flanders admits that the contrarian nature of the writing serves to make the book more entertaining to read.

Ilya Somin, author of Democracy and Political Ignorance, wrote an ultimately positive review of the book for the Volokh Conspiracy but also said that Brennan never states which topics a voter should try to focus on in order to become an "Informed Voter". He also states that Brennan's ideas are not very different from John Stuart Mill’s analysis of the moral duties of voters in his work Considerations on Representative Government. Mill's argument, in section ten of the 1861 essay Considerations on Representative Government, is that an extra set of votes should be apportioned to the highly educated in order that they may ensure the safety and well being of the country.

Both Josh Rothman with The Boston Globe and Alan Haworth with The Philosophers' Magazine praised the book for its new take on democratic engagement.

== See also ==
- The Myth of the Rational Voter by Bryan Caplan
- Considerations on Representative Government John Stuart Mill
- The Problem of Political Authority by Michael Huemer
