= Democracy and Political Ignorance =

2013 book by Ilya Somin

Democracy and Political Ignorance: Why Smaller Government Is Smarter
- Author: Ilya Somin
- Language: English
- Subject: Political philosophy, Government, Political ignorance
- Genre: Non-fiction
- Publisher: Stanford University Press
- Publication date: 2013 (original edition); 2016 (revised and expanded edition)

Democracy and Political Ignorance: Why Smaller Government Is Smarter is a 2013 book from Stanford University Press by George Mason University law professor Ilya Somin. Somin argues that people are ignorant and irrational about politics and that this creates problems for democracy. He further claims that this consideration argues in favor of smaller and more decentralized government.

A revised and expanded edition of the book was published in 2016. It includes new material on a variety of issues, including discussions of the "Big Sort" and its implications for "voting with your feet," the connection between political ignorance and the disproportionate political influence of the wealthy, new proposals for increasing political knowledge, and up-to-date survey data on political ignorance from recent elections. The book has also been published in Italian and Japanese translations.

== Themes ==
Somin published a series of guest posts on the Balkinization blog outlining the key themes of his book.

== Reception ==
=== Book reviews ===
Jack Shafer reviewed the book on his Reuters blog and discussed its implications for the role of mass media in democracy. Christopher Schmidt reviewed the book on his blog, part of the IIT Chicago-Kent Law blog network. A. Barton Hinkle reviewed the book for the Richmond Times-Dispatch. John David Dyche reviewed the book for WDRB. The book was also reviewed on Book Bargains and Previews.

Political commentator George Will reviewed the book favorably in an op-ed in The Washington Post.

Philosopher Jason Brennan briefly reviewed Somin's book on the Bleeding Heart Libertarians blog, ending with a strong recommendation to buy the book. Donald Boudreaux also offered a brief review and strong recommendation of the book on his blog, Cafe Hayek.

=== Discussions ===
Somin defended the thesis of his book in the lead essay of Cato Unbound in October 2013. Other participants in the exchange included Heather Gerken, Jeffrey Friedman, and Sean Trende. Gerken's response essay used the fox versus hedgehog distinction, arguing that Somin's ideal voter was a fox, whereas David Schleicher's work stressed that voters tended to be hedgehogs and use their party affiliation as an informational shortcut. Sean Trende argued that despite their ignorance, voters get the important things right. Jeffrey Friedman agreed that voters are ignorant, but claimed that rational ignorance was not the correct explanation of the phenomenon. Rather, he claimed that voters had a simplistic model of the world. Somin responded to all his critics and there was some further exchange of views between the participants.

The Cato Institute organized a book event to discuss the book, scheduled for November 6, 2013. Participants at the event included Somin, John M. Sides of George Washington University, and John Samples of the Cato Institute.

=== Other mentions ===
An article in Manila Times discussed Somin's book in the context of political protest movements in the Philippines.
