= Lisa Hill =

Lisa Hill may refer to:

- Lisa Christina Hill, girl who inspired the novel Bridge to Terabithia
- Lisa Hill (political scientist), professor of politics at the University of Adelaide, Australia
- Lisa Katharina Hill, German artistic gymnast
