= Against Democracy =

2016 book by Jason Brennan

- Author: Jason Brennan
- Language: English
- Subject: Political philosophy
- Published: 2016 (Princeton University Press)
- Publication place: United States
- Media type: Print
- Pages: 304
- ISBN: 978-0-691-16260-7

Against Democracy is a book by American political philosopher Jason Brennan. It contains Brennan's critical perspectives on democracy, a form of government in which the rights to rule are evenly given to every citizen, and argues for its replacement by the more limiting epistocracy, where such rights are achieved by the knowledgeable. The book was published on September 6, 2016 by Princeton University Press and has been translated into other languages. The German translation, Gegen Demokratie, published the next year, became a Der Spiegel bestseller.

Brennan starts the book by grouping citizens into three categories: Hobbits (abstain from voting and are careless), hooligans (irrational and biased), and vulcans (perceptive and disinterested). He argues that most citizens fit in one of these first two labels, or at least fall somewhere in the spectrum, and thenceforth contends that having the right to vote necessitates the voter to be vulcan-like. He contends that most citizens are vulnerable to misinformation, with which they hold biased points of view, and are also uninterested in obtaining useful knowledge about politics, which is attributable to rational ignorance. Even if vulcan-like citizens exist, their small numbers have almost no effect on the election or any governmental decision.

The book presents Brennan's objection to the usefulness of ubiquitous political participation and deliberative democracy, the latter of which he argues is achievable only if all the deliberators behave like vulcans do, that is, to be respectful of differing views. Arguments for democracy that he addresses and argues against include arguments of consent and the government's responsiveness. He proposes several forms of epistocratic government, among which are restricted suffrage and plural voting, and raises disagreement with arguments for democracy that are built upon mathematical theorems.

Against Democracy has been applauded for touching on the rarely discussed subject of democracy and its readability to lay readers. Criticism has been given to Brennan's description of the majority of citizens as being biased by in-group confirmation. The fact that he does not go deeper into the underlying causes of problems that he attributes to democracy and the potential of an epistocratic system being abused have also been subjects of criticism. Also noted by reviewers is that Brennan's use of surveys to prove his claim, which suggests that ignorance is widespread among voters, does not consider scholars who have expressed skepticism about their reliability.

== Synopsis ==
In the first chapter, Jason Brennan categorizes citizens into three categories:

1. Hobbits: They are indifferent to politics and hence do not have fixed opinions about political issues. To them, daily lives, rather than being cognizant of politics, are to be prioritized, and so they are ignorant of current political issues as well as the scientific theories and data needed to understand them. The typical American non-voter is a hobbit.
2. Hooligans: Described as the "rabid sports fans of politics", they have fixed political opinions and can present arguments to support their views. They are unable to elucidate points of view that conflict with theirs, however, and are generally biased in consuming information, seeking only the one that goes along with what they believe and rejecting the other that controverts it. This category includes most regular voters and politicians.
3. Vulcans: They think the most scientifically and rationally about politics. Their opinions are dictated by evidence and grounded in social science and philosophy. Vulcans can elaborate contrary views in a way that satisfies the hearer who holds these views and is tolerant of them as well. To be a vulcan is to be unbiased, and because no one is unbiased, no one can therefore be a "true vulcan".

Brennan writes that most citizens are either of the two first categories or at least fall somewhere in the spectrum, and henceforth thinks that they should stay away from politics. He thinks that political liberty and participation are not inherently good and can lead such citizens to outcomes that harm themselves or others. Brennan mentions three justifications for democracy: that it leads to more positive results than any other form of government does, it makes people more enlightened and educated, and intrinsically, it is beneficial, and he argues for the otherwise. In this chapter, he also writes an outline of all eight subsequent chapters.

In the second chapter, Brennan states that citizens are likely to be manipulated by misinformation, such as conspiracy theories, for not having enough knowledge or being informed of evidence, and shows data proving how generally ignorant Americans are when asked about their national history and politicians' stance on certain issues. Furthermore, he explains that citizens barely care about obtaining knowledge at all because they see that the cost of doing so tends not to give them the benefits that they expect, also known as rational ignorance. Brennan adds that even if a citizen has acquired sufficient knowledge of politics, the citizen's vote has almost no significant effect on the election. Also common is confirmation bias, in which one sticks to stances that one believes and searches for evidence that can support them while ignoring evidence that goes against them, as well as in-group favoritism, which makes one have hatred toward any group of differing views.

The third chapter discusses political participation, whereby citizens are obliged to vote in order to make themselves more understanding of or interested in politics, for which Brennan argues otherwise. He draws an analogy to philosophy majors who obtained their degrees owing to them having already been interested in philosophy. He continues to talk about deliberative democracy, which encompasses sundry kinds of democracy that make people come together to share and discuss ideas, so a consensus of what action or view to be taken can be reached. The rules to conduct such a deliberation include that the participants be consistent, sincere, and competent; that all forms of coercion and manipulation be avoided; and that everyone has the same right to opine. As Brennan suggests, most people are hooligans rather than vulcans, so the process of deliberation would be full of their defending their respective views and deceiving one another into confusion or an incorrect conclusion.

Brennan argues in the fourth chapter that democracy empowers groups, not individuals, and analyzes a number of arguments for democracy. The first one is the consent argument, which says that it is imperative to possess political liberties and to engage in political participation in order to express consent to government or build a consensual relationship with government. According to him, if an individual voter votes for a political party and it turns out that it does not win, then the voter, without giving consent, has to live under rules imposed by the winning party, which eventually rules the government. Another argument for democracy is that it makes the government responsive to one's interests, to which Brennan objects on the ground that an individual does not make any change at all, or even if it does, the probability is minuscule since it shares the same power as any other individual vote. He illustrates that if a citizen lives in the United States, of which 210 million are legal voters, then the citizen has one out of 210 million of the voting power.

The fifth chapter has Brennan's views of the soundness of semiotic arguments for democracy, which hold that respect is symbolized by the presence of equal power for everyone, and by which opponents of epistocracy argue that epistocracy leads to the exclusion of certain groups and distributes political power to an unequal extant. Brennan adds that epistocracy is aimed at finding better outcomes by people who have better judgment of political matters. He continues talking about epistocracy in the sixth chapter, where he concludes that there are presumptive rationales to choose epistocracy over democracy, and in the seventh chapter, he rebuts defenses of democracy that are based on mathematical theorems, by which proponents suggest that even though most voters are ignorant, competent decisions are still possible to obtain.

In the eighth chapter, Brennan puts forward a number of epistocratic forms of government, which he notes have several institutions comparable to what democracy has but with a striking difference in the distribution of the right to vote. These forms include restricted suffrage, where citizens undergo examinations through which citizens who obtain a poor score are eliminated from having political power; and plural voting, where citizens have one vote by default but, as they have passed examinations in order to show their knowledge, more votes are given to them. He goes on to address counterarguments to epistocracy, such as demographic objection, which states that political knowledge is disseminated in an unbalanced manner among all demographic groups. The ninth chapter is a "short postscript" in which he opines that politics have become a tool to antagonize one another, which accordingly happens from the nature of politics themselves, which put people in "genuinely adversarial relationships".

== Release ==
Princeton University Press published the hardcover on September 6, 2016, and the paperback on September 26, 2017. Against Democracy has been translated into several languages. It was translated into German by Stephan Gebauer under the title Gegen Demokratie. Published by Ullstein Verlag on April 7, 2017, it became a Der Spiegel bestseller. A Swedish translation, Efter demokratin (After Democracy), was published by Timbro förlag on November 23, 2017. In the same year, Gradiva published the Portuguese translation, entitled Contra a Democracia. The Spanish translation, Contra la democracia, done by Ramón González Férriz, was published by Deusto on April 26, 2018.

== Reception ==
In Essays in Philosophy, Valerie Soon described the book as "an elegantly argued, empirically substantiated work of non-ideal political theory", of which the contents may be helpful to political philosophers whose specialization is the relationship between ideal and non-ideal theory, and wrote that the "succinct, concrete style" employed by Brennan makes the reading comprehensible to general readers. However, she argued against several assumptions put forward by Brennan, including one saying that a person who is more knowledgeable is likelier to be just and has diminished cognitive bias. In an article for The Washington Post, law professor Ilya Somin praised him for "mak[ing] a strong case that the current electorate's right to rule is not nearly as defensible as we might want to assume". In spite of the fact that Brennan's epistocratic ideas are far from being implementable on a countrywide scale, Somin adds, they deserve in-depth consideration.

Simone Chambers of Perspectives on Politics, who called Against Democracy "provocative", commented that, as suggested by the title itself, what is mainly discussed in the work is not details of epistocracy but rather contention against democracy. She added that the book focuses more on making the case for epistocracy than on whether it is achievable or useful to society. On the second chapter, Chambers wrote that while Brennan touches on the matters of how most Americans do not have sufficient political knowledge and the relationship between one's group identity and one's political preferences, she suggested that he should have analyzed them much deeper instead of "squander[ing] the opportunity". She was also ambivalent in regard to Brennan's description of "most regular voters" nowadays that represent the hooligans and asserted that it was untrue even in the United States, from which the data cited in the book mostly come, writing of "a lot of evidence that humans are in-group/out-group thinkers and that group identity is used as a shortcut in preference articulation".

Los Angeles Times reviewer Molly Sauter wrote that Brennan's arguments in disagreement with democracy "will appear solidly argued, even lively, but not particularly novel" to anyone versed in democratic theory and the resulted dissatisfaction, stating that Against Democracy succeeds to deal with the untouched subject of democracy and would have liked Brennan to give more attention to the underlying causes of the problem described. In a 2017 column, Nathan J. Robinson of Current Affairs referred to the book as "the most spirited and comprehensive attempt at a philosophically coherent justification of despotic rule" among several that had been published since 2016, but faulted Brennan for not addressing the vulnerability of epistocracy being used for confirmation bias and its potential to help restore abolished hierarchies, such as the Jim Crow laws.

Kevin J. Elliott of Contemporary Political Theory praised the "stimulating" book for its reliance on empirical publications while addressing such topics as voters' competence and behavior, but bemoaned that it does not consider criticism of these data. For instance, the book shows surveys regarding citizens' poor performance in making competent decisions owing to their lack of knowledge but does not cite scholars questioning their reliability. Roslyn Fuller of the Los Angeles Review of Books opined that the book has a "lack of originality", as the idea of a government being ruled by a chosen few has appeared since the Ancient Greek era, but "is probably highly significant. Brennan's ideas may well be unpopular with the general public, but I suspect we would not be reading about them if they were not wildly popular in some circles. That, in itself, is certainly food for thought."

== See also ==
- Criticism of democracy
