= Lisa Hill (political scientist) =

Australian political scientist

Lisa Hill FASSA
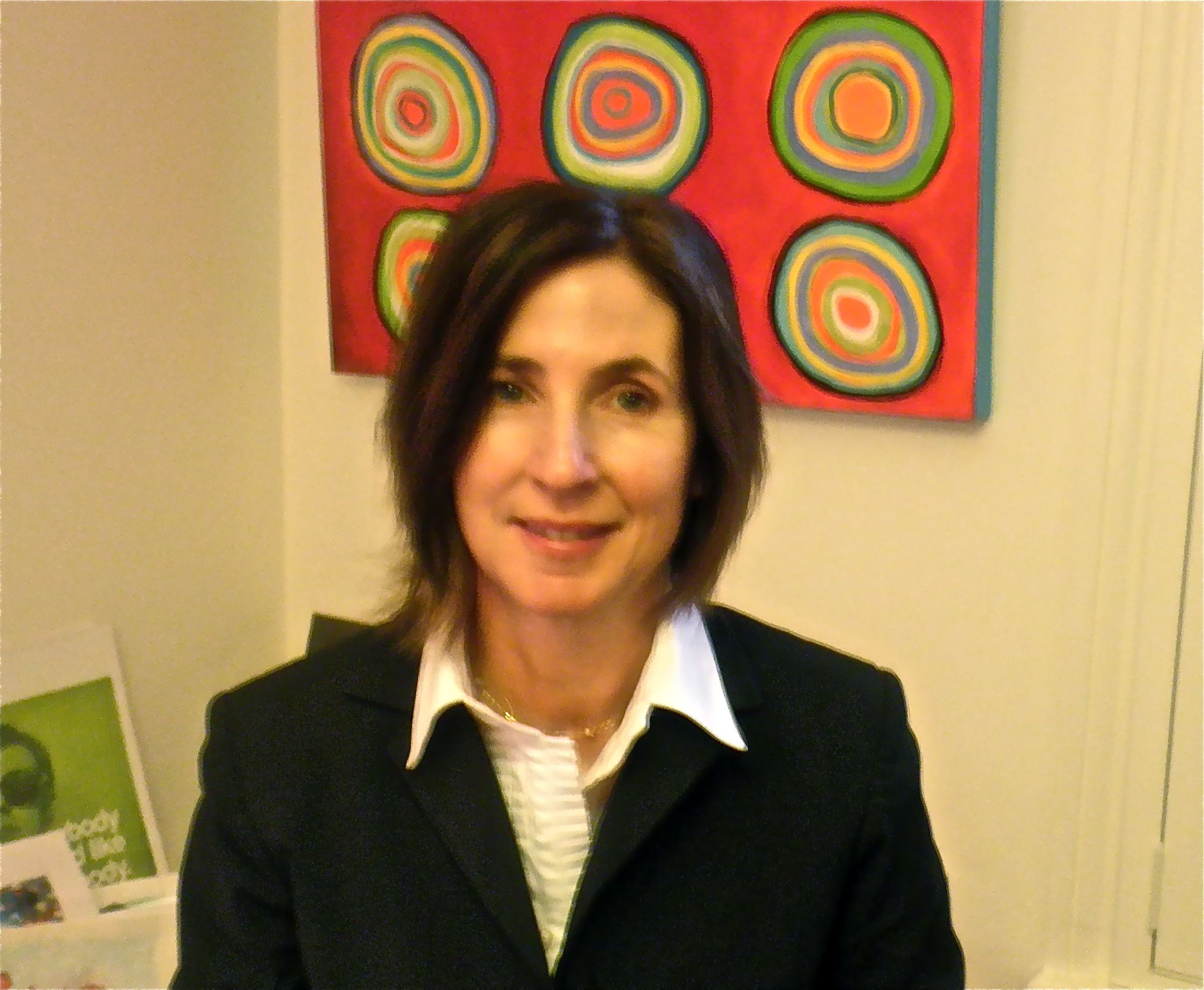
- Professor Lisa Hill, University of Adelaide
- Born: Hobart, Tasmania, Australia

Academic background
- Education: University of Tasmania; University College, Oxford University

Academic work
- Discipline: Political science; Political philosophy
- Institutions: University of Adelaide, Adelaide, Australia
- Notable ideas: Compulsory voting, Intellectual History
- Awards: Rhodes Scholarship (1985-88)
- Lisa Hill's voice Hill speaking about democracy Recorded 2 June 2026

Lisa Hill FASSA is an Australian political scientist. As of 2026 she is professor of politics at the University of Adelaide, and has previously held positions at the University of Sydney and the Australian National University.

== Early life and education ==
Hill studied at the University of Tasmania and was then a Rhodes Scholar at University College, Oxford University, England.

== Political work ==
Hill is an advocate for compulsory voting, pointing out that in Australia (where voting is compulsory) turnout has remained steady at about 95 per cent, whilst in voluntary voting systems around the world turnout has been on the decline. She has estimated that were Australia to introduce voluntary voting, turnout would decline to 60 per cent. She holds that the decline in turnout is most pronounced among younger, poorer and more marginalised voters, a factor that explains why there is more wealth inequality within voluntary systems: politicians have less incentive to cater to the needs of more marginalised voters, who are less likely to vote in voluntary systems.

Her expertise in the area has also been recognised by the Australian and British Electoral Commissions, as well as in the popular media, with her ideas being explored in such publications as Slate and the International Business Times.

She co-authored Compulsory Voting: For and Against (Cambridge University Press, 2014) with political philosopher Jason Brennan, who took the opposing side of the debate. The book has been called "the best and most thorough recent contribution to the literature on this subject" by Professor Ilya Somin of George Mason University School of Law.

As of 2017, Hill's work focused on challenging proponents of epistemic democracy, such as Brennan, who advocate for a political system in which an educated elite is given more political power. Such proponents argue that such recent, arguably undesirable, election outcomes such as the election of Donald Trump and Brexit would have been prevented under an epistocracy; Hill suggests that this is empirically incorrect, and argues that we should instead be focused on "how to deepen and expand" the franchise in order to improve our democracies.

Hill is also a founding member of the research committee of the Centre for Public Integrity, an independent think tank dedicated to preventing corruption, protecting the integrity of our accountability institutions, and eliminating undue influence of money in politics in Australia.

== Research interests ==
Hill's research interests include electoral law, Australian politics, history of political thought, social, political and economic thought of the Scottish Enlightenment, the development and pre-history of liberalism, classical political economy, political corruption, and classical Stoicism. She is particularly known for her work in support of compulsory voting.

== Recognition ==
Hill was elected a Fellow of the Academy of the Social Sciences in Australia in 2011.

== Personal life ==
Hill was the lead singer of The New Zekers. She paints for fun, and was the illustrator of the cover of Elleke Boehmer's 2005 book Colonial and Postcolonial Literature.

== Select publications ==
=== Books ===
- Hill, L., Max Douglass and Ravi Baltutis, 2022, Why and How to Regulate Political Disinformation, Londond/New York: Palgrave Macmillan.
- Hill, L. and Eden Blazejak, 2021. Classical Stoicism and the Western Political Tradition, Palgrave MacMillan.
- Hill, L 2019, Adam Smith's Pragmatic Liberalism: The Science of Welfare, Palgrave MacMillan, London/New York
- Malkopoulou, A. and Hill L. (eds). 2017. Equality and Representation, London: Routledge.
- Buchan, B & Hill, L 2014, The Intellectual History of Political Corruption, Palgrave Macmillan, London/New York. According to WorldCat, the book is held in 167 libraries.
- Brennan, J & Hill, L 2014, Compulsory Voting: For and Against, Cambridge University Press, New York and Cambridge. According to WorldCat, the book is held in 194 libraries.
- Hall, I & Hill L (eds.) 2009, British International Thinkers from Hobbes to Namier, Palgrave-MacMillan. According to WorldCat, the book is held in 131 libraries.
- Chappell, L, Chesterman, J & Hill, L 2009, The Politics of Human Rights in Australia, Cambridge University Press, Melbourne. According to WorldCat, the book is held in 237 libraries.
- Hill, L 2006, The Passionate Society: The Social, Political and Moral Thought of Adam Ferguson, Springer, Berlin and New York. According to WorldCat, the book is held in 174 libraries.
- Chappell, L & Hill, L (eds.) 2006, The Politics of Women’s Interests: New Comparative and International Perspectives, Routledge, London. According to WorldCat, the book is held in 188 libraries.

=== Articles ===
- Hill, L. 2021. ‘Adam Smith as Political Problem Solver: The “Project of an Empire” and the American War of Independence’, Adam Smith Review, Volume 12: 1-20.
- Malkopoulou, A. and Lisa Hill, 2020. ‘The Politics of Voter Presence’, International Political Science Review, Online First, https://doi.org/10.1177/0192512120922902
- Hill, L. and P. Nidumolu, 2020. ‘The Influence of Classical Stoicism on John Locke’s Theory of Self-Ownership’, History of the Human Sciences, 33 (2): 1-22.
- Hill, L 2017, 'Compulsory Voting and the Promotion of Human Rights in Australia', Australian Journal of Human Rights, 23(2): 188-202
- Hill, L & Rutledge-Prior, S 2016, 'Young People and Intentional Informal Voting in Australia', Australian Journal of Political Science, 51(3): 400-417
- Hill, L 2016, 'Voting Turnout, Equality, Liberty and Representation: Epistemic versus Procedural Democracy', Critical Review of International Social and Political Philosophy, 19(5): 283-300
- Hill, L 2015, 'Does Compulsory Voting Violate a Right Not to Vote ?', Australian Journal of Political Science, 50(1): 61-72
- Hill, L 2013, 'Deliberative Democracy and Compulsory Voting', Election Law Journal, 12(4): 454-467
- Hill, L 2013, 'Conceptions of Political Corruption in Ancient Athens and Rome', History of Political Thought, 34(4): 565-587
- Evans, G & Hill, L 2012, 'The Electoral and Political Implications of Reserved Seats for Indigenous Australians', Australian Journal of Political Science, 47(3): 491-505
- Hill, L 2012, 'Adam Smith on Thumos and Irrational Economic Man', European Journal of the History of Economic Thought, 19(1): 1-22
- Hill, L & Koch, C 2011, 'The Voting Rights of Incarcerated Australian Citizens', Australian Journal of Political Science, 42(6): 2013-28
- Hill, L 2011, 'Social Distance and the New Strangership in Adam Smith', Adam Smith Review, Volume 6, pp 166–183
- Hill, L 2011, 'Increasing Turnout Using Compulsory Voting', Politics, 31(1): 27-36
- Hill, L 2010, 'Public Acceptance of Compulsory Voting: Explaining the Australian Case', Representation, 46(4): 425-438
- Hill, L 2010, ''On the Justifiability of Compulsory Voting', British Journal of Political Science, 40(4): 917-923
- Hill, L & Alport, K 2010, 'Voting Attitudes and Behaviour Among Remote Aboriginal Peoples', Australian Journal of Politics and History, 56(2): 242-258
- Hill, L 2010, 'Adam Smith's Cosmopolitanism: The Expanding Circles of Commercial Strangership', History of Political Thought, 31(3): 449-473
- Young, S & Hill, L 2009, 'Uncounted Votes: Informal Voting in the House of Representatives as a Marker of Political Exclusion in Australia', Australian Journal of History and Politics, 55(1): 64-79
- Hill, L & Young, S 2007, 'Protest or Error? Informal Voting and Compulsory Voting', Australian Journal of Political Science, 42(3): 515-521
- Hill, L 2007, 'Adam Smith, Adam Ferguson and Karl Marx on the Division of Labour', Journal of Classical Sociology, 7(3): 339-366
- Hill, L 2006, 'Adam Smith and the Theme of Corruption', Review of Politics, 68(4): 636-662
- Hill, L 2006, 'Low Voter Turnout in the United States: Is Compulsory Voting a Viable Solution?', Journal of Theoretical Politics, 18(2): 207-232
- Hill, L 2002, 'Compulsory Voting: Residual Problems and Potential Solutions', Australian Journal of Political Science, 37(3): 437-455
- Hill, L 2002, 'On the Reasonableness of Compelling Citizens to Vote: The Australian Case', Political Studies, 50(1): 80-101
- Hill, L 2001, 'The First Wave of Feminism: Were the Stoics Feminists?', History of Political Thought, 22(1): 12-40
- Hill, L 2001, 'Eighteenth Century Anticipations of a Sociology of Conflict', Journal of the History of Ideas, 62(2): 281-299
- Hill, L 2001, 'The Hidden Theology of Adam Smith', European Journal of the History of Economic Thought', 8(1): 1-29

=== Talks ===
- 2019. Senate Occasional Lecture, 'Compulsory Voting: Effects and Trends', Parliament House Canberra
- 2018. Plenary Speaker and the International Political Studies Association World Congress. Topic: 'Compulsory Voting as an Australian Innovation'.

=== Encyclopedia articles ===
- Hill, L 2009, ‘Civil Society Theory: Adam Smith’, in International Encyclopedia of Civil Society, eds. H. K. Anheier & S. Toepler, Springer, New York.
- Hill, L 2009, ‘Adam Ferguson’, in Encyclopedia of Political Theory, ed. M. Bevir, Sage, London.
- Hill, L 2007, ‘Compulsory Voting’, in The Oxford Companion to Australian Politics, eds. B. Galligan & W. Roberts, Oxford University Press, Melbourne.
- Hill, L 2007, ‘Citizen Initiated Referenda’, in The Oxford Companion to Australian Politics, eds. B. Galligan & W. Roberts, Oxford University Press, Melbourne.

=== Media activities ===
- 2019. July 31. Radio Interview and Podcast with Walled Aly and Scott Stephens for 'Minefield', Radio National. Topic: Should the Voting Age be Lowered?
- 2019. June 11. ABC Radio Adelaide interview (With Eden Blazejak) on Hedonism and Epicureanism.

=== Other ===
- Hill, L 2019, 'We Asked Five Experts: Should Australia Lower the Voting Age to 16?', The Conversation, March 27
- Hill, L & Louth, J 2018, 'Electoral Inclusion Among South Australian People Experiencing Homelessness: the Work Ahead', ERRN Working Paper Series.
- van Ham, C, Hill, L & Chappell L 2017, 'The Things Australia Can Do to be a Human Rights Hero', The Conversation
- Hill, L 2016, 'Factcheck Q&A: how unusual is compulsory, and do 90% of New Zealanders vote without it?', The Conversation
- Hill, L 2016, 'Election Explainer: Why Do I have to Vote Anyway?', The Conversation
- Hill, L 2015, 'Compulsory Voting, much like democracy, beats the alternatives', The Conversation
- Hill, L 2011, 'What We've Seen in Australia with Mandatory Voting', New York Times, November 7
