= Critical Review (American journal) =

Academic journal

- Discipline: Political theory, political science
- Language: English
- Edited by: Samuel DeCanio

Publication details
- History: 1986–present
- Publisher: Routledge for the Critical Review Foundation
- Frequency: Quarterly
- Impact factor: 1.4 (2022)

Standard abbreviations
- ISO 4: Crit. Rev.
- NLM: Crit Rev (N Y)

Indexing
- CODEN: CTRVE3
- ISSN: 0891-3811 (print); 1933-8007 (web)
- LCCN: sn86002793
- OCLC no.: 50588476

Links
- Journal homepage; Online archive

Critical Review: A Journal of Politics and Society is a quarterly academic journal covering political science that is published by Routledge for the Critical Review Foundation. It publishes papers on political theory, public opinion, and political economy. It was established in 1986 by editor-in-chief Jeffrey Friedman, who works with authors in "an aggressive, often substantive editing process" but also gives authors the option of double-blind peer review.

According to the Journal Citation Reports, the journal has a 2022 impact factor of 1.4.
