= Louise Chappell =

Australian political scientist

- Education: University of New England; University of Sydney
- Awards: Fellow, Academy of the Social Sciences in Australia
- Scientific career
- Fields: Political science
- Workplaces: University of New South Wales

Louise A. Chappell AM FASSA is an Australian political scientist. She is a Scientia Professor at the University of New South Wales, where she was also the former director of the Australian Human Rights Institute from 2018-2020. She studies gender and politics, the politics of the International Criminal Court, and the politics of Australia in comparative perspective.

== Career ==
Chappell attended the University of New England in New South Wales, where she earned a bachelor's degree and a graduate certificate in political science in 1990. In 1998, she graduated from the University of Sydney with a PhD in political science.

In 2002, Chappell published Gendering Government: Feminist Engagement with the State in Australia and Canada. The study compared the interactions of feminists in Canada and Australia with their respective governments since the 1970s, as they advocated for policies on women's rights and issues that particularly affect women. Chappell studies how the different arrangements of electoral, bureaucratic, legal, and federal institutions in Canada and Australia prompted feminist activists to use different strategies in their attempts to influence policy, and compares the resulting political outcomes. Chappell uses the fact that Canada and Australia have superficially similar Westminster systems to explore which deeper institutional differences might have caused the differences in outcomes between the two countries. Gendering Government won the 2003 Victoria Schuck Award from the American Political Science Association, which honors the best book published on the topic of women and politics each year.

Chappell wrote a second book, The Politics of Gender Justice at the International Criminal Court, in 2016. The book studies the implementation of the rules on gender justice that were part of the Rome Statute of the International Criminal Court, examining why the application of those rules by the International Criminal Court has been uneven and incomplete. Chappell has also been an co-editor on multiple edited volumes. Together with the political scientist Lisa Hill, she edited the 2006 volume The Politics of Women's Interests: New Comparative Perspectives, and with Lisa Hill and John Chesterman she edited the book The Politics of Human Rights in Australia in 2009.

In addition to her publications in peer-reviewed journals, Chappell has also published articles in news outlets like ABC News Australia, The Sydney Morning Herald, and The Conversation.

Chappell holds the title of Scientia Professor at the University of New South Wales, which is awarded by the university to "highly performing Professors". In 2016, Chappell was named a Fellow of the Academy of the Social Sciences in Australia. From 2010 to 2014, she was an Australian Research Council Future Fellow.

== Selected works ==
- Gendering Government: Feminist Engagement with the State in Australia and Canada (2002)
- "New institutionalism through a gender lens: Towards a feminist institutionalism?", International Political Science Review, with Fiona Mackay and Meryl Kenny (2010)
- The Politics of Gender Justice at the International Criminal Court (2016)

== Selected awards and recognition ==
- Fellow, Academy of the Social Sciences in Australia
- Australian Research Council Future Fellow
- Member of the Order of Australia (AM) for "significant service to tertiary education, to human rights, and gender justice" (2026)
