= Compulsory voting =

Practice of requiring all eligible citizens to register and vote in elections

Compulsory voting, also called universal civic duty voting or mandatory voting, is the requirement that registered voters participate in an election. As of January 2026, 21 countries have compulsory voting laws. Law enforcement in those countries varies considerably, and the penalty for not casting a ballot without a proper justification ranges from severe to non-existent.

== History ==
=== Antiquity ===
Athenian democracy held that it was every Athenian citizen's duty to participate in decision-making, but attendance at the assembly was voluntary. Sometimes there was some form of social opprobrium to those not participating, particularly if they were engaging in other public activity at the time of the assembly. For example, Aristophanes's comedy Acharnians 17–22, in the 5th century BC, shows public slaves herding citizens from the agora into the assembly meeting place (Pnyx) with a red-stained rope. Those with red on their clothes were fined. This usually happens if fewer than 6,000 people were in attendance, and more were needed for the assembly to continue.

In the Roman Republic, the legitimacy of the form of government known as res publica, which entrusted the powers of sovereignty to an elected aristocracy, was most evident in the Roman right to suffragium. Cicero argues that the right to vote provided Roman citizens with a certain degree of political participation, thereby guaranteeing their de facto ownership of their property, which they could administer as they wished. In practice, voting was conducted only in Rome, either in the Campus Martius or in the Forum, and not many citizens would have been able to afford the journey or take time off to vote. In addition, contrary to Greek custom, there was no economic compensation for voting; however, Cicero mentions an election that could not continue because of particularly low voter turnout, requiring a temporary draft to be implemented, though it is unclear if this was an exceptional case.

=== Modern era ===
From the 19th century onward, a relatively small number of democracies have introduced compulsory voting at one time or another. From 1862 to 1998, compulsory voting was enacted in 20 democracies, most of which were in Western Europe or Latin America. Belgium has the oldest extant compulsory voting system which was introduced in 1893 for men, and in 1948 for women.

Compulsory voting for national elections was introduced in Australia in 1924, with states and territories passing their own compulsory voting laws at various times. Voluntary voting in Australia before 1924 accounted between 47% and 78% turnout of eligible voters. Following the introduction of compulsory federal voting in 1924, this figure increased to between 91% and 96%, with only 5% of eligible voters accounted as not enrolled. The Netherlands and Venezuela are among several countries that have moved from compulsory to voluntary voting, in 1967 and 1993 respectively. Venezuela saw turnout drop from 82% to 61% in 1993 once compulsion was removed.

== Arguments for ==
=== Capture voter preferences ===
A system with higher turnout helps make the electorate more representative and voter suppression more difficult. This major step towards the universal democratic principle of "one person, one vote" strengthens democracies and aligns the choices of its politicians with the preferences of its citizens. Since lower-turnout races are not randomized samples of an electorate (unlike a citizens' assembly), they distort the wishes and power of the electorate.

=== Civil responsibility ===
Supporters argue the democratic election of governing representatives is a citizen's responsibility as opposed to a right. Equating in kind to similar civil responsibilities such as taxation, jury duty, compulsory education or military service, voting in these democracies is regarded as one of the "duties to community" mentioned in the United Nations Universal Declaration of Human Rights. This view asserts that, by introducing an obligation to vote, all citizens governed by a democracy partake in the responsibility for the government appointed by democratic election.

=== Improve candidate choices ===
Monash University political scientist Waleed Aly argues that whether compulsory voting favors the right or the left is beside the point, because the most beneficial aspect of compulsory voting is that it will improve the caliber of individuals who run for office and the quality of the decisions that they make. In his words, "In a compulsory election, it does not pay to energize your base to the exclusion of all other voters. Since elections cannot be determined by turnout, they are decided by swing voters and won in the center... That is one reason Australia's version of the far right lacks anything like the power of its European or American counterparts. Australia has had some bad governments, but it hasn't had any truly extreme ones and it isn't nearly as vulnerable to demagogues."

=== Mild penalties provide big boosts in turnout ===
Penalties only need to be modest to boost turnout and achieve the goal of attaining a much more representative electorate, especially since the public and the courts usually insist on a seamless voting process for places with mandatory voting laws.

=== Paradox of voting ===
Supporters of compulsory voting also argue that voting addresses the paradox of voting, which is that for a rational, self-interested voter, the costs of voting will normally exceed the expected benefits. The paradox disproportionately affects the socially disadvantaged, for whom the costs of voting tend to be greater. Australian academic and supporter of compulsory voting, Lisa Hill, has argued that a prisoner's dilemma situation arises under voluntary systems for marginalized citizens: it seems rational for them to abstain from voting, under the assumption that others in their situation are also doing so, to conserve their limited resources. However, since these are people who have a pronounced need for representation, this decision is irrational. Hill argues that the introduction of compulsory voting removes this dilemma.

=== Political legitimacy ===
The idea that compulsory voting results in a higher degree of political legitimacy is based on higher voter turnout and the more representative electorate that brings.

=== Protect against demagogues ===
High levels of participation decreases the risk of political instability created by crises or charismatic but sectionally focused demagogues.

=== Reduce income inequality ===
A 2005 Inter-American Development Bank working paper purported to show that there was a correlation between compulsory voting, when enforced strictly, and improved income distribution, as measured by the Gini coefficient and the bottom income quintiles of the population. A 2011 Conference Board of Canada study on world income inequality – also relying on the Gini index – shows that income inequality is lowest in the Scandinavian countries, where compulsory voting has never existed, while Australia, and to a lesser extent Belgium, which strictly enforce their compulsory voting legislation, have a higher income inequality level than a number of other Western countries, such as Canada, France, Germany, Switzerland, and the Netherlands, where compulsory voting does not exist.

=== Remove voting restrictions ===
Supporters of compulsory voting also argue that just as the secret ballot is designed to prevent interference with the votes actually cast, compelling voters to the polls for an election removes interference with accessing a polling place, reducing the impact that external factors such as the weather, transport, or restrictive employers might have. If everybody must vote, restrictions on voting are identified and steps are taken to remove them. This notion is especially reinforced when both men and women are required to vote and further sustained by diligent enforcement of laws requiring registration of all eligible voters (deemed adult and without exclusion of any significant community within the population). A growing voter preference towards pre-polling such as vote by mail can make participation easier, where the voter can fulfil their obligation more at their own convenience prior to polling day, rather than trying to arrange release from their responsibilities on the nominated date of polling.

=== Stimulate political interest and education ===
Other perceived advantages to compulsory voting are the stimulation of broader interest politics, as a sort of civil education and political stimulation, which creates a better informed population. For example, since far fewer campaign funds are needed to convince people to vote, they can be directed towards discussing proposed policies with a wider range of voters. Australian senator Herbert Payne, whose 1924 private member's bill introduced compulsory voting in Australia, believed compulsory voting was necessary to counteract "apathy and indolence" among voters and would bring "a wonderful improvement in the political knowledge of the people".

== Arguments against ==
=== Regressive taxation ===
Concerns about fines landing harder on the poorest citizens can lead to reforms to ensure penalties are mild for the poorest citizens and that voting is accessible and seamless for all to help assure concerned voters that mandatory voting will not become a regressive tax. The impact of these fines can be mitigated by making sure they do not compound over time, are weighted based on income, and by providing an option to perform community service in lieu of payment.

=== Compelled speech ===
Another concern expressed about compulsory voting is that it would compel speech, which violates freedom of speech which includes the freedom not to speak. Former Australian opposition leader Mark Latham urged Australians to lodge blank votes for the 2010 election. He stated the government should not force citizens to vote or threaten them with a fine. At the 2013 federal election, considering the threat of a non-voting fine of up to A$20, there was a turnout of 92%, of whom 6% lodged either informal or blank ballot papers. Systems in democratic countries, which have a secret ballot, allow for blank ballots, but voting systems could also add a 'none of the above' option to each race so as to provide multiple clear ways for voters to refrain from speaking/voting if, for some reason, a voter does not want to submit a partially or fully blank ballot.

=== Religious objections ===
Religious objection is one that many Christadelphians and Jehovah's Witnesses, for example, cite as for why they should not participate in political events. As a result, many countries allow religious beliefs as a valid excuse for not going to the polls.

=== Civil liberties ===
American libertarians in particular debate to what extent voting is a civic duty and not just a civic right. Even in the case of the US where most Americans see voting as a civic duty, most Americans in a 2020 poll did not like the idea of imposing a US$20 fine on those who did not cite an excuse for not voting including a conscientious objection.

=== Vote buying ===
One perceived downside to compulsory voting is that by coercing politically apathetic people to vote in elections, they are vulnerable to manipulation through vote buying.

== Impact ==
A 2015 study of a Swiss canton where compulsory voting was enforced found that compulsory voting significantly increased electoral support for leftist policy positions in referendums by up to 20 percentage points. A 2008 study found that the effects of universal turnout in the United States would likely be small in national elections, but that universal turnout could matter in close elections, such as the presidential elections of 2000 and 2004. In the United States, Democrats would most likely fare better under universal voting, as nonvoters are generally more Democratic, but due to the rarity of close elections in the United States, universal voting would change "very few election outcomes".

2011 research on compulsory voting in Australia found that it increased the vote shares and seat shares of the Australian Labor Party by 7 to 10 percentage points and led to greater pension spending at the national level. While weakly enforced compulsory voting in Austria increased overall turnout by roughly 10 percentage points, there is "no evidence that this change in turnout affected government spending patterns (in levels or composition) or electoral outcomes."

A 2016 study found that compulsory voting reduces the gender gap in electoral engagement in several ways. A 2016 study of the Netherlands found that the abolition of compulsory voting increased the vote share of Dutch social democratic parties while reducing the vote share of "minor and extreme parties". 2016 research suggests that higher rates of voter turnout lead to higher top tax rates. A 2024 study found that compulsory voting can reduce political polarization and push political parties towards the preferences of the median voter by eliminating the ability of extremist partisans to threaten to abstain from voting, which pressures parties to adopt policies to appease those voters.

== Public opinion ==
According to a 1997 paper by Malcolm Mackerras and Ian McAllister, in Australia "polls taken over the years have consistently shown a community support of between 60 and 70 per cent" for compulsory voting. In 2005, polls taken by Roy Morgan Research and Ipsos-Mackay found 71 and 74 percent support respectively. Both polls also found there was roughly equal support for compulsory voting among supporters of Australia's major political groups, the Liberal–National Coalition and the Australian Labor Party. In Belgium, which has had compulsory voting since 1893, support for the abolition of compulsory voting is in progression. Results from a 2016 public opinion poll showed that 49% of respondents were in favor of abolition (46% in Wallonia, 49% in Brussels, 51% in Flanders) with 10% having no opinion. In Canada, an e-consultation conducted in 2016 by the House of Commons' Special Committee on the Electoral Reform showed that 50.3% of the 22,247 respondents strongly disagreed or disagreed with the statement "Canadians should be required to cast a ballot in a federal election (this could include spoiling a ballot)", as opposed to 36.3% who strongly agreed or agreed.

== Current and past use by countries ==
As of December 2021, 21 countries were recorded as having compulsory voting. Of these, only 10 countries (additionally one Swiss canton) enforce it. As of January 2020, of the 36 member states of the Organisation for Economic Co-operation and Development (OECD), only Australia had forms of compulsory voting which were enforced in practice. Voting in Belgium, Greece, Luxembourg, Mexico and Turkey is compulsory de jure but not enforced.

Place	Exempt	Turnout	Enforced?	Penalized	History
Argentina	Ages 16, 17, and anyone over 70. The judges and their assistants who must provide services on election day. Those who are more than 500 km away on election day. Those who are sick or disabled due to force majeure.	75%	Yes		Introduced in 1912 with the Sáenz Peña Law. Registered voters who abstain from voting without a verified justification, are liable to pay a fine. In case of non-payment, the person concerned is barred from dealing with public bodies for one year. Turnout peaked around 85% in the 1980s.
Australia	Travel, illness, religious objection, seasonal workers, anyone without a fixed address, not registered to vote (but registration is compulsory)	92%	Yes	1%	Introduced for state elections in Queensland in 1915, excluding Indigenous Australians. Victoria introduced compulsory voting in 1926, New South Wales and Tasmania in 1928, Western Australia in 1936 (excluding Indigenous Australians), and South Australia in 1942. It was introduced for federal elections in 1924 for British subjects aged 21 and in 1984 for Indigenous Australians. Enrollment and voting at federal elections was introduced for Indigenous Australians in 1949, but was voluntary until both enrollment and voting became compulsory in 1984 for all eligible electors. The compulsory voting age for federal elections was reduced to 18 in 1974. Australia has one of the highest electoral turnout rates in the world. Since the introduction of compulsory voting in 1924, the turnout at Australian elections has rarely fallen below 90%. For first-time offenders, a fine is issued for AU$20 with a maximum penalty of AU$180, which is regularly enforced. Voter registration, called enrolment in Australia, is also compulsory.
Belgium	Not registered to vote	90%	No		Introduced in 1894. Every citizen and registered non-Belgian voter, from the age of 18 must cast a vote at federal, provincial, local and European parliament elections. Before 2003, fines from 40 to €80, and up to €200 for reoffenders were levied, but if they fail to vote in at least four elections, they can lose the right to vote for 10 years and non-voters also might face difficulties getting a job in the public sector. In reality, since 2003, offenders are almost never prosecuted. Penalties are immediate for absent appointed polling station staff. The key Flemish Community parties on the right wish to abolish compulsory voting, and did so in the case of Flemish local elections, starting with the 2024 elections. In the French Community of Belgium, parties on the left adamantly support compulsory voting while those on the right increasingly favor its abolition.
Bolivia	Over 70, absent on Election Day, force majeure	92%	Yes		Since 1952. Voters are given a card after voting to prove participation. Otherwise they receive a fine and are unable to receive their salary from the bank if they cannot show proof of voting for the three months following the election.
Brazil	Ages 16, 17, and anyone over 70, those far away from home on election day (must be pre-approved) or cannot read	80%	Yes		Since 1932. Compulsory for all Brazilian citizens, including Brazilians residing abroad. Those who do not vote in an election and do not later present an acceptable justification (such as being away from their voting location at the time) are subject to a fine of R$3.51 (about US$0.65 in August 2020). Proof of voting compliance (by having voted, justified the absence or paid the fine) is required for some transactions such as obtaining a Brazilian passport, admission to a public university, government employment, and loans from a government-owned bank. 56% of Brazilians were against the policy in a 2020 study.
Chile	Health incompatibility, being over 200 km away from voting poll and any justification accepted by local courthouse.	TBD			In 2012, an amendment of the Chilean Constitution of 1980 eliminated the obligation to vote (and the up to $200 fines that discouraged many low-income citizens from registering) and established automatic registration for all citizens (Law 20,568). In 2022 mandatory voting was reintroduced while automatic registration into the voting registry was kept.
Costa Rica		63%	No		Absenteeism was consistently around 20 percent until the 1990s, when it jumped to nearly 30 percent.
Ecuador	Ages 16, 17, and anyone over 65 or who cannot read	82%	Yes		Introduced in 1936.
Egypt		33%	No		Egyptian law provides for a fine and even a jail sentence for those who do not vote, but in practice the law is not applied, and turnouts are low, such as 47.5% at the 2014 presidential election, then down to 28.3% at the parliamentary election the following year.
Fiji		~70%	No		Not enforced starting in 2014.
Greece	Over 70	~60%	No		There used to be punishments such as not being able to issue a passport, driving license and occupational license. These sanctions were lifted in 2000.
Honduras		58%	No		While the Constitution of Honduras says voting is compulsory, the Electoral Code does not mention penalties for not voting.
Liechtenstein		78%	Yes		The Act on the Exercise of Political Rights in National Affairs (1973) states that "Participation in elections and votes is a compulsory civic duty" with fines issued for those who do not qualify for an exemption.
Luxembourg	Under 18 or over 75, live abroad	90%	No		Compulsory for Luxembourg citizens aged between 18 and 75 who live in Luxembourg. Foreign nationals (in local elections for all foreigners and European elections for European citizens only) may register to vote if resident in Luxembourg, with the previous five-year residency requirement lifted in 2023. Enrolment for foreign nationals on the electoral roll is a free choice, not a requirement; however, once an eligible foreign national has registered to vote, then voting becomes compulsory for them. Penalties for not voting range from €100-250 for a first offence to up to €1000 for a repeat offence. However, no fines have been imposed since 1963.
Mexico		54%	No		The Constitution of Mexico mentions that voting is a citizen's obligation (Art. 36), but the Electoral Code does not establish penalties for not voting.
Nauru		90%	Yes		Introduced in 1965 when it was still an Australian possession.
North Korea		99%	Yes		Everyone over age 17 is required to vote. However, only one candidate from the ruling Workers' Party of Korea or its partners in the Democratic Front for the Reunification of Korea appears on the ballot. Voting is designed to track who is and is not in the country (including who may have defected). Dissenting votes are possible but are considered acts of treason that can have consequences for someone and their family since ballots are not secret.
Paraguay	Over 75	65%	No		Citizens between 18 and 75 years old. Turnout at the 2013 general elections was 68.5%, then went down to 61.2% at the 2018 election.
Peru	Over 70	81%	Yes		Introduced in 1933.
Pitcairn Islands		100%	Yes		All permanent residents over 18 years of age are required to vote. Those who do not vote, without a valid excuse, are subject to a fine up to NZ$25.
Samoa		93%	Yes		Samoa adopted compulsory voting in 2018. It was implemented for the first time in the 2021 Samoan general election.
Singapore	Travel, illness, under 21	95%	Yes		Enforced since 1959. Electors who was absent from polling during nomination day will result in the names being delisted from the electoral roll, and requires either a valid reason or a S$50 payment to have their names reinstated. Note that any names that are currently present in the electoral roll is among one of the eligibility requirements for candidates to run in the election under the Constitution.
Swiss canton of Schaffhausen			Yes		Compulsory voting has never existed at the national level in Switzerland. However, starting in the late 19th century, it was passed by several cantons, but by 1974 had been repealed everywhere but Schaffhausen.
Thailand		67%	No		
Turkey		83.45%	No		Introduced in 1983 for parliamentary election and in 1984 for local elections. Registered voters who abstain from voting without justification are fined.
Uruguay	Health issues, absence on election day, force majeure, citizenship suspension.	90%	Yes		Introduced in 1934, but not enforced until 1970. Registered voters who abstain from voting without justification are fined. Fines are doubled if the nonvoter is a public servant or a graduate professional. In cases of non-payment the person concerned is barred from dealing with public bodies (whether acting in a personal interest or as a legal representative), collecting fees or salaries, registering for exams in universities, purchasing registered property, or buying tickets for travel to another country.

=== Repealed ===
Countries where voting is no longer compulsory:

Country	
(People's Socialist Republic of Albania) Albania	Compulsory voting, which existed throughout the communist period and produced official turnouts of 100%, was repealed with the new election law of November 1990 and January 1991 during the fall of Communism in Albania.
Austria	At the national level, introduced in 1924. Repealed in 1992. At the provincial level in Styria, Tyrol and Vorarlberg, repealed in 1992.
Bulgaria	Due to the low turnouts at elections, the National Assembly introduced compulsory voting in 2016 – the only European country to do so in more than 50 years – but the Constitutional Court of Bulgaria annulled the law the following year, declaring that the right to vote was a subjective right and not a public function that entailed an obligation to vote.
Cyprus	Introduced after independence from the British Empire in 1960. Repealed in 2017, after having been inactive for many years.
Dominican Republic	Compulsory voting, which was not enforced in practice, was repealed with the 2010 Constitution of the Dominican Republic which states: "Nobody can be obligated or coerced, under any pretext, in the exercise of their right of suffrage or to reveal their vote." In 2017, a proposal by an opposition party to establish compulsory voting was defeated.
Guatemala	Repealed in 1990.
Italy	Between 1945 and 1993. (Possible arbitrary or social sanctions, called the "innocuous sanction", where it might, for example, be difficult to get a daycare place for the citizen's child or similar.)
Lebanon	Repealed at least since the electoral law of 1996.
Netherlands	Introduced under the Pacification of 1917 along with universal suffrage, repealed it in 1967. In 1946, a survey conducted by the Netherlands Institute of Public Opinion (NIPO), in the Netherlands, reported that 66 percent of those asked favored repealing compulsory voting. In 1966, the public was polled again, this time by the Politics in the Netherlands survey, and responded 69 percent in favor of the policy. In 1967, the Free University of Amsterdam polled voters on whether they thought the compulsory voting laws at the time were "right" or "wrong"; 70 percent of those asked answered "right", 28 percent answered "wrong", and 2 percent gave no opinion. In January 1969, the Netherlands Institute of Public Opinion polled again, and found 53 percent of those asked were in favor of abolishing compulsory voting, while 29 percent wished to keep it. In 1999, support for compulsory voting in the Netherlands was just at 35 percent.
Panama	The current laws of Panama do not mention any sanctions and do not specify the obligation to vote.
Philippines	Compulsory and enforced during the regime of Ferdinand Marcos.
Portugal	1933 Portuguese constitutional referendum, not enforced.
Spain	1907–1923, but not enforced.
Switzerland	Widespread among the country's 26 cantons in the 19th century but progressively abandoned since then with only Schaffhausen still retaining it.
(Georgia (U.S. state)) U.S. state of Georgia	Article XII of the 1777 Constitution of Georgia provided for mandatory voting. This provision was omitted from the revised Georgia constitution adopted after the ratification of the United States Constitution in 1788.
Venezuela	Removed in 1993. Had been largely unenforced before then. Turnout since 1998 has averaged 62% compared with almost 90% on average between 1970 and 1993 during compulsory voting.

== Measures to encourage voting ==
Although voting in a country may be compulsory, penalties for failing to vote are not always strictly enforced. In Australia and Brazil, providing a legitimate reason for not voting, such as illness, is accepted. In Australia, if a citizen is asked why they did not vote and they reply that it is against their religion, the Electoral Act provides that this answer must be taken as conclusive, and no further action is to be taken. In Argentina, those who were ill on voting day are excused by requesting a doctor to prove their condition. Those over 500 km (310 mi) away from their voting place are also excused by asking for a certificate at a police station near where they are. Belgian voters can vote in an embassy if they are abroad or can empower another voter to cast the vote in their name. The voter must give a "permission to vote" and carry a copy of the ID card and their own on the actual elections.

States that sanction nonvoters with fines generally impose small or nominal penalties. This can be seen as reflecting the practical rationale for compulsory voting – that compulsion is aimed at making it more irksome not to vote than to vote, and therefore mild penalties are all that is required. Penalties for failing to vote are not limited to fines and legal sanctions. Belgian voters who repeatedly fail to vote in elections may be subject to disenfranchisement. Singaporean voters who fail to vote in a general election or presidential election will be subjected to disenfranchisement until a valid reason is given or a fine is paid.

Goods and services provided by public offices may be denied to those failing to vote in Peru and Greece. In Brazil, people who fail to vote in an election are barred from obtaining a passport and subject to other restrictions until settling their situation before an electoral court or after they have voted in the two most recent elections. If a Bolivian voter fails to participate in an election, the person may be denied withdrawal of the salary from the bank for three months. A postal vote may be available for those for whom it is difficult to attend a polling station. Pre-poll voting at nominated polling stations in Australia has been increasing in recent years.

== See also ==
- Citizens' assembly
- Get out the vote
- Jury duty
