= Ilya Somin =

American law professor (born 1973)

- Илья Сомин
- Born: 1973 (age 52–53); Leningrad, Russian SFSR, USSR (now Saint Petersburg, Russia)

Academic background
- Education: Amherst College (BA); Harvard University (MA); Yale University (JD)

Academic work
- Discipline: Constitutional law
- Institutions: George Mason University; Cato Institute

Ilya Somin (Russian: Илья Сомин; born 1973) is an American legal scholar. He is a law professor at George Mason University, B. Kenneth Simon Chair in Constitutional Studies at the Cato Institute, a blogger for the Volokh Conspiracy, and a former co-editor of the Supreme Court Economic Review (2006–2013). His research focuses on constitutional law, property law, migration rights, and the study of popular political participation and its implications for constitutional democracy.

== Biography ==
Somin was born to Jewish parents in the USSR in 1973. At age five, he emigrated along with his family to the United States. In a personal memoir, Somin recounted both the material poverty in the USSR (that he experienced firsthand) and the ideological indoctrination (that he learned about from family members, and saw glimpses of as a child).

Somin received a Bachelor of Arts, summa cum laude, in political science and history from Amherst College in Massachusetts in 1995, a Master of Arts in political science from Harvard University in 1997, and a Juris Doctor from Yale Law School in Connecticut in 2001.

After graduating from law school, Somin clerked for Judge Jerry Edwin Smith of the United States Court of Appeals for the Fifth Circuit in Houston, Texas, from 2001 to 2002. He served as a visiting fellow in law at the Northwestern University Law School in Chicago, Illinois, from 2002 to 2003.

Somin joined the faculty of the George Mason University School of Law in Arlington County, Virginia, in fall 2003. He served as an assistant professor from 2003 to 2009 and as an associate professor of law with tenure from 2008 to 2012. He was promoted to full professor of law at George Mason University in 2012 and has held the position since then.

== Views ==
=== Political ignorance ===
Like other public choice theorists, Somin argues that rational ignorance is a major problem for the successful functioning of democracy. He has argued for this position in a number of published articles, and has in particular been critical of the ideal of deliberative democracy.

Somin notes that rational irrationality, as described by Bryan Caplan in The Myth of the Rational Voter, is a problem. Somin departs from traditional public choice theorists by carving out an important place for rational irrationality, while at the same time disagreeing with Caplan's assertion that rational ignorance alone would not be a problem.

Somin's book Democracy and Political Ignorance: Why Smaller Government is Smarter elaborates on this thesis. He also defended the theory in the lead essay of Cato Unbound in October 2013. Other participants in the exchange included Heather Gerken, Jeffrey Friedman, and Sean Trende. Gerken's response essay used the fox versus hedgehog distinction, arguing that Somin's ideal voter was a fox, whereas David Schleicher's work stressed that voters tended to be hedgehogs and use their party affiliation as an informational shortcut. Political commentator George Will reviewed the book favorably in a Washington Post op-ed.

Somin's work on political ignorance stretches back some 15 years before the publication of Democracy and Political Ignorance. He published a much-cited article on political ignorance in the interdisciplinary journal Critical Review in 1998. In 2004, he wrote a policy analysis for the Cato Institute titled "When Ignorance Isn't Bliss: How Political Ignorance Threatens Democracy" that laid out the case he would elaborate in his book. In 2010, he wrote a critique of deliberative democracy based on his research on political ignorance.

Somin's work on political ignorance has been covered by media around the world, including Washington Post columnist George Will and the Chicago Tribune.

=== Originalism ===
Somin is a proponent of originalism: he argues that judges should interpret the Constitution according to its original public meaning. Somin has written an article about the relationship and tension between constitutional originalism and political ignorance. He has also blogged about the history of originalism, the relation between originalism and discrimination, the relation between originalism and affirmative action, and other topics related to originalism.

=== Tariffs ===
Somin had the idea that a lawsuit against most of the tariffs in the second Trump administration could be successful. He also helped get it off the ground, thereby sowing the seeds for one of the most significant recent rulings by the US Supreme Court. It has been decades since the constitutional judges have stopped such a central initiative by a president.

Somin brought the lawsuit together with the Liberty Justice Center. They were later joined by prominent legal scholars and Supreme Court litigators Neal Katyal and Michael McConnell as counsel for the plaintiffs. Katyal is the former acting solicitor general under President Obama and is one of the most prominent legal representatives in the United States. Few lawyers have argued before the Supreme Court more often, and even fewer with such success.

=== Property rights ===
Somin has been critical of eminent domain laws that permit governments to take over land by force. He was critical of the court decision in Kelo v. City of New London and has defended eminent domain reforms undertaken by US states in the wake of the incident, while arguing that such reforms may not go far enough in protecting private property rights. Somin has argued that Detroit's abuse of eminent domain "deter[red] investment by undermining confidence in the security of property rights." Somin's book on the topic of property rights and eminent domain, titled The Grasping Hand: "Kelo v. City of New London" and the Limits of Eminent Domain was published by the University of Chicago Press and released on June 15, 2015. Many commentators consider it the leading work on the controversial Kelo case, and "public use" restrictions on takings. The book was described as the definitive analysis and critique of Kelo by leading legal scholars Richard Epstein and James Krier, and also endorsed by attorneys for both sides in the case.

== Authorship ==
Ilya Somin's latest book is Free to Move: Foot Voting, Migration, and Political Freedom (Oxford University Press, 2020). It argues for expanding opportunities for people to "vote with their feet" both domestically and through international migration.

Somin is the author of Democracy and Political Ignorance: Why Smaller Government Is Smarter, published by Stanford University Press) in 2013. A revised second edition was published in 2016. In the book, Somin expands on his public choice-style case for limited government.

Somin's book The Grasping Hand: "Kelo v. City of New London" and the Limits of Eminent Domain expands on his work on eminent domain and property rights, and was published in June 2015 by the University of Chicago Press.

Somin is the co-author, along with other Volokh Conspiracy bloggers, of the book A Conspiracy Against Obamacare: The Volokh Conspiracy and the Health Care Case. Somin's co-authors include Randy Barnett, Jonathan H. Adler, David Bernstein, Orin Kerr, and David Kopel. Trevor Burrus is the editor.

He is also co-editor of Eminent Domain in Comparative Perspective, published by Cambridge University Press in 2017.

Contributing to the anthology Our American Story (2019), Somin addressed the possibility of a shared American narrative and built on his prior themes surrounding "foot voting" through immigration, both internally between subnational jurisdictions as well as immigration from other countries.

=== Other works ===
- Somin, Ilya (2018). "Part IV: What Is the Role of the State?; Ch. 25: Freedom and Knowledge". In Brennan, Jason; van der Vossen, Bas; Schmidtz, David (eds.). The Routledge Handbook of Libertarianism. London and New York: Taylor & Francis Group. pp. 358–373. ISBN 978-0367870591.

== Media ==
Somin has participated many times in the New York Times Room for Debate Forum.

Somin's articles have been published by a number of mainstream news and opinion outlets in the United States including The New York Times, Washington Post, The Wall Street Journal, USA Today, CNN, National Review, Forbes, Los Angeles Times, and others.

Somin's blog posts at Volokh Conspiracy have been cited in many mainstream news outlets. Somin's blog post about the Supreme Court decision in Fisher v. University of Texas was cited by a number of news outlets. Blog posts by Ilya Somin about the Supreme Court's decisions related to gay marriage (specifically, decisions about the Defense of Marriage Act and California Proposition 8 made in June 2013) were also widely cited.

Somin is a co-counsel to the Liberty Justice Center on the 2025 United States Court of International Trade case V.O.S. Selections, Inc. v. Trump which challenged the constitutionality of president Trump's "Liberation Day" tariffs.
