= Rational irrationality =

Economics concept

The concept known as rational irrationality was popularized by economist Bryan Caplan in 2001 to reconcile the widespread existence of irrational behavior (particularly in the realms of religion and politics) with the assumption of rationality made by mainstream economics and game theory. The theory, along with its implications for democracy, was expanded upon by Caplan in his book The Myth of the Rational Voter.

The original purpose of the concept was to explain how (allegedly) detrimental policies could be implemented in a democracy, and, unlike conventional public choice theory, Caplan posited that bad policies were selected by voters themselves. The theory has also been embraced by the ethical intuitionist philosopher Michael Huemer as an explanation for irrationality in politics. The theory has also been applied to explain religious belief.

== Theory ==
=== Two types of rationality, and preferences over beliefs ===
Caplan posits that there are two types of rationality:

- Epistemic rationality, which roughly consists of forming beliefs in truth-conducive ways, making reasonable efforts to avoid fallacious reasoning, and keeping an open mind for new evidence.
- Instrumental rationality, which involves choosing the most comprehensively effective means to attain one's actual goals, given one's actual beliefs.

Rational irrationality describes a situation in which it is instrumentally rational for an actor to be epistemically irrational.

Caplan argues that rational irrationality is more likely in situations in which:

- people have preferences over beliefs, i.e., some kinds of beliefs are more appealing than others and
- the marginal cost to an individual of holding an erroneous (or irrational) belief is low.

In the framework of neoclassical economics, Caplan posits that there is a demand for irrationality. A person's demand curve describes the amount of irrationality that the person is willing to tolerate at any given cost of irrationality. By the law of demand, the lower the cost of irrationality, the higher the demand for it. When the cost of error is effectively zero, a person's demand for irrationality is high.

=== Rational irrationality versus doublethink ===
Rational irrationality is not doublethink and does not state that the individual deliberately chooses to believe something he or she knows to be false. Rather, the theory is that when the costs of having erroneous beliefs are low, people relax their intellectual standards and allow themselves to be more easily influenced by fallacious reasoning, cognitive biases, and emotional appeals. In other words, people do not deliberately seek to believe false things but stop putting in the intellectual effort to be open to evidence that may contradict their beliefs.

=== Sources of preferences over beliefs ===
For rational irrationality to exist, people must have preferences over beliefs: certain beliefs must be appealing to people for reasons other than their truth value. In an essay on irrationality in politics Michael Huemer identifies some possible sources of preferences over beliefs:

- Self-interested bias: People tend to hold beliefs that, if generally accepted, would benefit themselves or the group with whom they identify. Self-interested bias is complicated by the fact that people may identify with groups to which they do not belong, but feel good about assuming that identity.
- Beliefs as self-image constructors: People prefer to hold beliefs that best fit with the images of themselves that they want to adopt and to project.
- Beliefs as tools of social bonding: People prefer to hold the political beliefs of other people they like and with whom they want to associate.
- Coherence bias: People are biased towards beliefs that fit well with or reinforce their existing beliefs, regardless of those beliefs' degree of coherence with reality.

== Religion ==
Many of the claims of religions are not easily verifiable in the day-to-day world. There are many competing religious theories about the origins of life, reincarnation, and paradise, but mistaken beliefs about these rarely impose real world costs upon the believers themselves. Thus, it may be instrumentally rational to be epistemically irrational about these matters. In other words, when forming or updating their religious beliefs, people may tend to relax their intellectual standards for the sake of driving popular support towards their beliefs.

== Politics ==
=== Rational irrationality in individual political beliefs ===
Politics is a situation where rational irrationality is expected to be common, according to Caplan's theory. In typical large democracies, each individual voter has a very low probability of influencing the outcome of an election or determining whether a particular policy will be implemented. Thus, the expected cost of supporting an erroneous policy (obtained by multiplying the cost of the policy by the probability that the individual voter will have a decisive role in influencing the policy) is very low. The psychological benefits of supporting policies that feel good but are in fact harmful may be greater than these small expected costs. This creates a situation where voters may be rationally irrational for practical morale reasons.

=== Rational irrationality and systemic biases ===
For rational irrationality at an individual level to have an effect on political outcomes, it is necessary that there be systemic ways in which people are irrational. In other words, people need to have systemic biases: there needs to be a systemic difference between people's preferences over beliefs and true beliefs. In the absence of systemic biases, different forms of irrationality would cancel out when aggregated using the voting process.

Caplan attempts to demonstrate empirically the existence of systemic biases in beliefs about economics in his book The Myth of the Rational Voter.

=== Implications for the outcomes of democracy ===
When a large number of individuals hold systematically biased beliefs, the total cost to the democracy of all these irrational beliefs could be significant. Thus, even though every individual voter may be behaving rationally, the voters as a whole are not acting in their collective self-interest. This is analogous to the tragedy of the commons. Another way of thinking about it is that each voter, by being rationally irrational, creates a small negative externality for other voters.

Caplan believes that the rational irrationality of voters is one of the reasons why democracies choose suboptimal economic policies, particularly in the area of free trade versus protectionism. Philosopher Michael Huemer, in a TEDx talk on rational irrationality in politics, cited the war on terror and protectionism as two examples of rational irrationality in politics.

== Competing and opposing theories of democracy and politics ==
Any theory of democracy must take into account the empirical fact that most voters in a democracy have very little idea about the details of politics, including the names of their elected representatives, the terms of office, and the platforms of candidates of major political parties.

Like rational irrationality, some theories of democracy claim that democracies tend to choose bad policies. Other theories claim that despite the empirical observations about voter ignorance, democracies do in fact do fairly well. Below are listed some of these theories and their relation to rational irrationality.

=== Rational ignorance and public choice theory ===
The most famous theory of democratic failure is public choice theory. The theory, developed by James Buchanan, Gordon Tullock, and others, relies on rational ignorance. Voters have a very small probability of influencing policy outcomes, so they do not put much effort to stay up-to-date on politics. This allows special interests to manipulate the political process and engage in rent seeking. A key idea of public choice theory is that many harmful policies have concentrated benefits (experienced by special interests) and diffuse costs. The special interests experiencing the benefits are willing to lobby for the policies, while the costs are spread out very diffusely among a much larger group of people. Because these costs are diffuse, the people bearing the costs do not have enough at stake to lobby against the policies.

Rational irrationality and rational ignorance share some key similarities but are also different in a number of ways. The similarities are that both theories reject the claim that voters are rational and well-informed, and both theories claim that democracy does not function well. However, the theories differ in a number of ways:

- Rational ignorance does not predict any systemic biases in voter beliefs. Rather, it is consistent with voters having beliefs that are wrong in random ways with no overall direction of bias. Rational irrationality, on the other hand, predicts that systemic biases are apt to occur in areas where the policies that feel good are systemically different from the policies that are, in fact, good.
- Public choice theory explains the failure of democracy in terms of special interests frustrating the will of the people, who are rationally ignorant. With rational irrationality, on the other hand, it is possible for democracies to choose bad policies even if the will of the people is implemented. This does not rule out the possibility of special interest manipulation but gives it a secondary role.

There are two main objections to public choice theory and rational ignorance that do not apply to rational irrationality:

- Miracle of aggregation: If voter errors are purely random and a result of ignorance, then the random errors of the ignorant voters should cancel out and even a small proportion of well-informed voters should suffice for democracy to function well. The objection, at least in this form, does not apply to rational irrationality, because rational irrationality supports systemic biases in the voting population.
- Mechanisms that may be devised to keep politicians in check: There are a number of strategies for rationally ignorant voters to keep politicians in check without needing to keep themselves informed about all the details of politics. For instance, if special interest capture is a problem, and voters are rational, voters should tend to be skeptical of any proposed government program by default and demand strong evidence that it is not a sell-out to special interests. By an adverse selection-type phenomenon, this should cause government to shrink. Empirically, this does not seem to happen, as voting publics are often enthusiastic about government programs whose details they do not understand very well. This suggests either that special interest capture is not a significant problem or that voters are not behaving rationally. This is less of a problem for rational irrationality because voter support for a policy may be an example of rational irrationality.

=== Expressive voting ===
Brennan and Lomasky have an alternative theory of democratic failure that is quite similar to Caplan's theory of rational irrationality. Their theory, called expressive voting, states that people vote to express certain beliefs. The key difference between expressive voting and rational irrationality is that the former does not require people to actually hold systematically biased beliefs, while the latter does.

Loren Lomasky, one of the proponents of expressive voting, explained some of the key differences between the theories in a critical review of Caplan's book.

=== Wittman's theory of democratic success ===
Donald Wittman has argued that democracy works well. Wittman's argument rests on raising a number of objections to public choice theory, such as those outlined above while contrasting public choice theory and rational irrationality. Caplan described his own work on rational irrationality as an attempt to rescue democratic failure from Wittman's attacks. After the publication of Caplan's book, Wittman and Caplan debated each other.

== See also ==
- Behavioral economics
- Bounded rationality
- Choice architecture
- Cognitive miser
- Dysrationalia
- Predictably Irrational
- Psychohistory
- Rational ignorance
- Rationality and Power
- Satisficing
- Social heuristics
- Subjective theory of value
