= Jason Brennan =

American philosopher and business professor (born 1979)

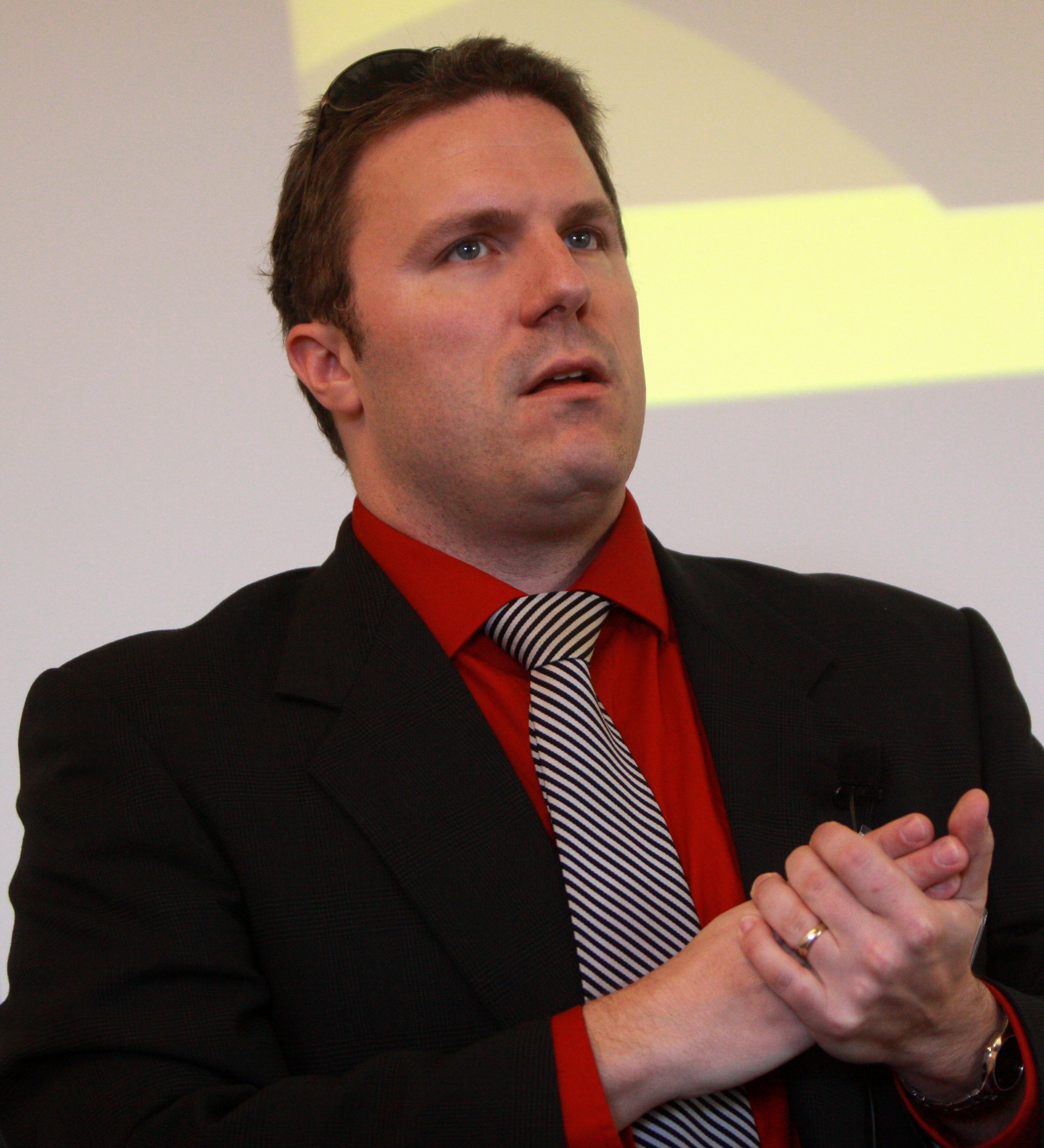
- Brennan in 2013
- Born: Jason F. Brennan; 1979 (age 46–47)

Education
- Education: University of New Hampshire (BA); University of Arizona (MA, PhD)

Philosophical work
- Era: Contemporary philosophy
- Region: Western philosophy
- School: Analytic philosophy Libertarianism
- Institutions: Brown University; Georgetown University
- Main interests: Political philosophy, Democratic theory, Business ethics, Applied ethics
- Notable ideas: Ethics of voting; epistocracy
- Website: jasonfbrennan.com

Jason F. Brennan (born 1979) is an American philosopher and business professor. He is the Robert J. and Elizabeth Flanagan Family Professor of Strategy, Economics, Ethics, and Public Policy at Georgetown University's McDonough School of Business. His research concerns political philosophy, democratic theory, the ethics of voting, libertarianism, business ethics, and the moral foundations of markets.

Brennan is known for his criticisms of democracy, his work on the ethics of voting, and his arguments concerning the moral limits of markets. His book Against Democracy (2016) attracted academic and public attention for questioning whether democratic participation is intrinsically valuable and for examining epistocracy, or political rule by the knowledgeable, as a possible alternative to conventional democratic institutions.

With Peter Jaworski, Brennan has defended the moral permissibility of commercial exchanges that critics regard as inappropriate forms of commodification. Their book Markets without Limits argues that introducing payment into an otherwise permissible activity does not necessarily make it morally objectionable.

Brennan is editor-in-chief of Philosophy & Public Affairs and previously served as editor-in-chief of Public Affairs Quarterly.

== Education and academic career ==
Brennan grew up in Tewksbury, Massachusetts, and Hudson, New Hampshire, where he attended Alvirne High School. He attended Case Western Reserve University and earned a bachelor's degree in philosophy from the University of New Hampshire in 2001. He received his PhD in philosophy from the University of Arizona in 2007, studying under David Schmidtz.

From 2006 to 2011, Brennan held research and teaching appointments at Brown University, including work with its Political Theory Project. He joined Georgetown University's McDonough School of Business in 2011 and became the Robert J. and Elizabeth Flanagan Family Professor of Strategy, Economics, Ethics, and Public Policy in 2018.

Brennan became editor-in-chief of Philosophy & Public Affairs in 2024. He previously served as editor-in-chief of Public Affairs Quarterly from 2021 to 2025 and has served as an associate editor of Social Philosophy and Policy.

== Philosophical work ==
=== Democracy and political competence ===
Brennan's research on democracy examines political competence, voting ethics, political legitimacy, and the quality of collective decision-making.

In The Ethics of Voting (2011), Brennan challenges the view that citizens have a general moral duty to vote. He argues that voting can impose costs and risks on others and that citizens therefore have an obligation to vote responsibly if they choose to participate. Under some circumstances, he maintains, citizens who lack sufficient knowledge or cannot vote competently ought to abstain.

In Against Democracy (2016), Brennan questions whether democratic participation possesses intrinsic moral value. Drawing on empirical political science, the book examines widespread voter ignorance, partisan bias, and the potential for political participation to worsen rather than improve citizens' reasoning and behavior.

The book considers several forms of epistocracy, in which political power would be partly distributed according to political knowledge or competence rather than equally among adult citizens. Brennan argues that such arrangements should be considered as potential alternatives to conventional democracy and evaluated according to their expected institutional performance.

Brennan subsequently continued his examination of democratic institutions in Debating Democracy (2021), a debate with Hélène Landemore, and Democracy: A Guided Tour (2023), which surveys philosophical and empirical debates concerning democracy.

=== Markets and commodification ===
Another major area of Brennan's research concerns the moral foundations of markets and the ethical significance of commercial exchange.

In Markets without Limits: Moral Virtues and Commercial Interests (2016), coauthored with Peter Jaworski, Brennan challenges philosophical arguments against the commodification of particular goods and services.

The authors defend the proposition that, if an activity may permissibly be performed without payment, there is generally some morally permissible way to perform the same activity for payment. They distinguish objections to markets as such from objections concerning harmful consequences, exploitation, coercion, or other features of particular transactions.

Brennan has also written about capitalism, socialism, immigration, economic liberty, and the relationship between commerce and human flourishing. Books addressing these subjects include Why Not Capitalism? (2014), In Defense of Openness (2018), written with Bas van der Vossen, Why It's OK to Want to Be Rich (2020), and Debating Capitalism (2026), written with Richard Arneson.

=== Political authority and resistance to injustice ===
In When All Else Fails: The Ethics of Resistance to State Injustice (2018), Brennan examines the moral permissions and obligations of citizens confronting unjust government conduct.

He challenges the claim that government officials possess special moral immunity against defensive resistance. Brennan defends a principle of moral parity between state and non-state actors, arguing that actions permissible in defense against private wrongdoing may also be permissible against wrongdoing committed by government officials under relevantly similar circumstances.

The book considers civil disobedience alongside more confrontational forms of resistance, including deception, sabotage, and defensive force.

=== Other work in applied ethics ===
Brennan's other research examines ethics in higher education, criminal justice, professional conduct, charity, and moral judgment.

With Philip Magness, Brennan wrote Cracks in the Ivory Tower: The Moral Mess of Higher Education (2019), which examines ethical problems within universities. With Christopher W. Surprenant, he wrote Injustice for All (2020), addressing the role of financial incentives in the American criminal justice system.

In Glass Houses: Choosing Grace in a Judgmental World (2026), Brennan argues for the importance of grace and restraint in moral judgment. The book examines the effects of bias, self-deception, and status competition on people's assessments and treatment of one another.

== Reception and public debate ==
Brennan's work on democracy, political ignorance, and epistocracy has received attention in academic philosophy and in public discussions of democratic governance.

In a substantial examination of Against Democracy published in The New Yorker in 2016, Caleb Crain situated Brennan's arguments within a longer philosophical tradition of skepticism about democratic rule. Crain questioned whether Brennan's proposed alternatives adequately addressed the dangers of restricting voting rights, including the historical use of political knowledge tests to disenfranchise minority groups. He also questioned whether Brennan had established that politically knowledgeable citizens would reliably make better collective decisions.

Political philosopher Thomas Christiano, reviewing Against Democracy for Notre Dame Philosophical Reviews, criticized Brennan's reliance on models of individual voter ignorance to draw conclusions about the performance of democratic institutions. Christiano argued that Brennan's account gave insufficient attention to how democratic institutions aggregate information, produce collective decisions, and perform in practice.

In The Washington Post, philosophers Eric Schliesser and Tom van der Meer discussed Brennan's proposals for epistocracy alongside proposals for selecting political representatives by lottery. They criticized both approaches as alternatives to representative democracy, raising questions about the distribution of political power and the capacity of alternative institutions to improve democratic governance.

Political scientist and legal scholar Ilya Somin, also writing in The Washington Post, agreed with substantial parts of Brennan's criticism of voter ignorance while expressing doubts about the feasibility of epistocratic reforms. Somin argued that governments responsible for designing knowledge-based voting systems might manipulate them for partisan advantage, and questioned whether greater voter knowledge would be sufficient to overcome the informational problems of modern government.

Brennan's work on the morality of markets has also received academic critical attention. Reviewing Markets without Limits for Notre Dame Philosophical Reviews, Jonathan Anomaly supported the authors' general challenge to objections based on disgust and the symbolic meaning of money, while suggesting that their arguments might imply stronger obligations to challenge harmful social conventions than they acknowledged.

In a review of When All Else Fails, Simone M. Sepe questioned whether Brennan's principle of moral parity adequately accounted for political legitimacy and the coordination problems that could arise when individuals resist public officials on the basis of their own judgments of injustice.

== Teaching and educational initiatives ==
Brennan developed the Ethics Project, an experiential learning assignment in business ethics at Georgetown University. Students work in groups to identify a worthwhile objective, develop a plan, and carry out the project outside the classroom.

The assignment gives students substantial freedom in selecting and implementing their activities while requiring them to reflect upon the ethical and practical consequences of their decisions. At Georgetown, participating groups receive funding to support their projects. Student initiatives have included charitable fundraising, entrepreneurship, and service organizations.

In 2022, Brennan received Georgetown University's Provost's Innovation in Teaching Award for developing the Ethics Project.

In 2024, Poets&Quants selected Brennan as one of its 50 Best Undergraduate Business Professors. The publication's profile discussed his teaching methods and experiences of students participating in the Ethics Project.

Brennan also participated in the development of Georgetown's Business Ethics in a Box, a collection of freely accessible teaching materials intended to support business ethics education at other institutions.

In 2025, the Clark Foundation established a $3 million endowment to support the Ethics Project.

== Books ==
=== Political philosophy and democratic theory ===
- A Brief History of Liberty (Wiley-Blackwell, 2010), with David Schmidtz
- The Ethics of Voting (Princeton University Press, 2011)
- Libertarianism: What Everyone Needs to Know (Oxford University Press, 2012)
- Compulsory Voting: For and Against (Cambridge University Press, 2014), with Lisa Hill
- Against Democracy (Princeton University Press, 2016)
- Political Philosophy: An Introduction (Cato Institute, 2016)
- In Defense of Openness: Why Global Freedom Is the Humane Solution to Global Poverty (Oxford University Press, 2018), with Bas van der Vossen
- When All Else Fails: The Ethics of Resistance to State Injustice (Princeton University Press, 2018)
- Debating Democracy (Oxford University Press, 2021), with Hélène Landemore
- Democracy: A Guided Tour (Oxford University Press, 2023)
- Debating Libertarianism: What Makes Society Just? (Oxford University Press, 2025), with Samuel Freeman

=== Markets, business ethics, and other subjects ===
- Why Not Capitalism? (Routledge, 2014; expanded second edition, 2024)
- Markets without Limits: Moral Virtues and Commercial Interests (Routledge, 2016; second edition, 2022), with Peter Jaworski
- Cracks in the Ivory Tower: The Moral Mess of Higher Education (Oxford University Press, 2019), with Philip Magness
- Injustice for All: How Financial Incentives Corrupted and Can Fix the US Criminal Justice System (Routledge, 2020), with Christopher W. Surprenant
- Good Work If You Can Get It: How to Succeed in Academia (Johns Hopkins University Press, 2020)
- Why It's OK to Want to Be Rich (Routledge, 2020)
- Business Ethics for Better Behavior (Oxford University Press, 2021), with William English, John Hasnas, and Peter Jaworski
- Questioning Beneficence: Four Philosophers on Effective Altruism and Doing Good (Routledge, 2024), with Samuel Arnold, Ryan Davis, and Richard Yetter Chappell
- Debating Capitalism: Market Liberalism or Social Democracy (Oxford University Press, 2026), with Richard Arneson
- Glass Houses: Choosing Grace in a Judgmental World (Oxford University Press, 2026)

=== Edited works ===
- The Routledge Handbook of Libertarianism (Routledge, 2017), with Bas van der Vossen and David Schmidtz
