= Sean Trende =

American journalist and political analyst (born 1973)

Personal details
- Born: January 6, 1973 (age 53)
- Education: Yale University (BA); Duke University (MA, JD); Ohio State University (PhD)

Sean P. Trende (born January 6, 1973) is an American journalist and political analyst specializing in American elections analysis. He is a Senior Elections Analyst at RealClearPolitics. He has regularly appeared as a guest on Fox News, NPR’s All Things Considered, and CNN Radio. The Washington Times calls him "a premier political number cruncher". He is the author of Lost Majority, published by Palgrave Macmillan. On September 12, 2012, National Journal announced that Trende would be a co-author of the 2014 Almanac of American Politics.

Trende holds a B.A. degree from Yale University, an M.A. in political science, a J.D. from Duke University, a masters in applied statistics and a PhD from The Ohio State University. He practiced law for eight years at Kirkland & Ellis LLP and Hunton & Williams LLP before becoming a full-time political analyst. After living in Midlothian, Virginia with his wife and children, as of 2017 he lives in the Columbus, Ohio area and is working part-time as a professor at Ohio State University.

In 2021, Trende was selected as one of two redistricting special masters by the Supreme Court of Virginia, after it was tasked with redrawing the state's congressional and legislative districts following the 2020 United States census. Republican legislative leaders Tommy Norment and Todd Gilbert had included Trende as part of a replacement list of nominees for the post, after the three nominees on their initial list were all disqualified by the Court for suspected partisanship.
