= Jeffrey Friedman (political scientist) =

American political scientist (1959–2022)

- Born: March 25, 1959
- Died: December 2, 2022 (aged 63); Cambridge, Massachusetts, U.S.
- Education: Brown University (BA); University of California, Berkeley (MA); Yale University (PhD)
- Known for: Critical Review
- Scientific career
- Fields: Political science

Jeffrey Friedman (March 25, 1959 – December 2, 2022) was an American political scientist and was the founder and editor of Critical Review: A Journal of Politics and Society.

Friedman majored in history and philosophy at Brown University. He received an MA in history at the University of California, Berkeley, in 1985 and a PhD in political science from Yale in 2002. He taught in the Government department at Dartmouth College in 1998, the Social Studies program at Harvard from 1998 to 2000, and the Political Science department at Barnard College, Columbia University from 2001 to 2006.

Friedman was a visiting scholar in the Charles and Louise Travers Department of Political Science University of California, Berkeley and the Max Weber Fellow of the Institute for the Advancement of the Social Sciences at Boston University.

Friedman died in Cambridge, Massachusetts, on December 2, 2022, at the age of 63.

== Books ==
- The Rational-Choice Controversy: Economic Models of Politics Reconsidered (ed.) Yale University Press (1996).
- What Caused the Financial Crisis. (ed.) University of Pennsylvania Press (2010).
- Engineering the Financial Crisis: Systemic Risk and the Failure of Regulation w/ Wladimir Kraus – University of Pennsylvania Press (2011).
- Power Without Knowledge: A Critique of Technocracy. Oxford University Press (2019).
