= Downs' paradox of voting =

Paradox of the expected benefit of voting

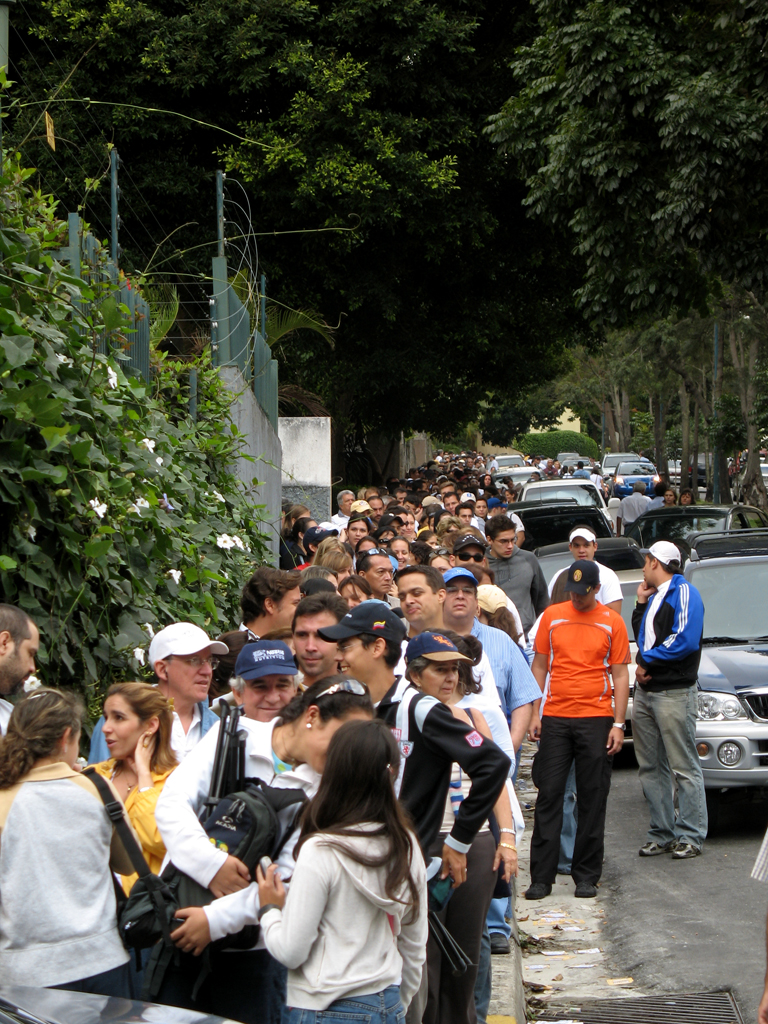
A crowd of voters queuing at a polling station in Caracas

The paradox of voting, also called Downs' paradox, is that for a rational and egoistic voter (Homo economicus), the costs of voting will normally exceed the expected benefits. Because the chance of exercising the pivotal vote is minuscule compared to any realistic estimate of the private individual benefits of the different possible outcomes, the expected benefits of voting are less than the costs. Responses to the paradox have included the view that voters vote to express their preference for a candidate rather than affect the outcome of the election, that voters exercise some degree of altruism, or that the paradox ignores the collateral benefits associated with voting besides the resulting electoral outcome.

== History of scholarship ==
The issue was noted by Nicolas de Condorcet in 1793 when he stated, "In single-stage elections, where there are a great many voters, each voter's influence is very small. It is therefore possible that the citizens will not be sufficiently interested [to vote]" and "... we know that this interest [which voters have in an election] must decrease with each individual's [i.e. voter's] influence on the election and as the number of voters increases." In 1821, Hegel made a similar observation in his Elements of the Philosophy of Right: "As for popular suffrage, it may be further remarked that especially in large states it leads inevitably to electoral indifference, since the casting of a single vote is of no significance where there is a multitude of electors."

This problem in modern public choice theory was analysed by Anthony Downs in 1957. In a rational voter model the expected utility of voting U can be described as:

$$U = B \cdot p - C$$,

where $B$ is the benefit of a pivotal vote, $p$ is the probability of a pivotal vote and $C$ is the cost of voting.

== Support of the rational voter model ==
Predictions of the rational voter model on voter turnout dependency on total number of voters, competitiveness of elections, underdog status and cost of voting have been confirmed in a 2007 laboratory study. A stochastic element of voter turnout dependency on expected utility was found in the laboratory study.

== Effect of polls ==
A 2020 study found the anticipated competitiveness of elections based on polls resulted in a causal increase of voter turnout.

== Modifications of the rational voter model ==
=== Bounded rationality ===
Bounded rationality with Quantal response equilibrium was found to be a better fit of observations in a 2007 laboratory study compared to a Nash equilibrium. The Logit Quantal response equilibrium predicted a 17% voter turnout for elections with a large number of voters without additional altruistic or civic duty terms.

=== Altruism theory of voting ===
The altruism theory of voting assumes that voters are rational but not fully egoistic. In this view voters have some degree of altruism to voters of the same party. The altruistic utility increases with the large number of voters of the same party, which can explain the rationality of voting despite only a small chance of individually affecting the outcome.

=== Civic duty ===
Voter turnout was found to increase with civic duty. Civic duty can be represented in the rational voter model as an additional benefit to voting independent of casting a pivotal vote. Voting and engaging in political discourse may increase the voter's political knowledge and community awareness, both of which may contribute to a general sense of civic duty. "I Voted" stickers and slogans such as "If you don’t vote, you can’t complain!" are connected to civic duty and citizenship models.

=== Other benefits ===
Geoffrey Brennan and Loren Lomasky suggest that voters derive "expressive" benefits from supporting particular candidates – analogous to cheering on a sports team – rather than voting in hopes of achieving the political outcomes they prefer. This implies that the rational behavior of voters includes the instrumental as opposed to only the intrinsic value they derive from their vote.

The magnitudes of electoral wins and losses are very closely watched by politicians, their aides, pundits and voters, because they indicate the strength of support for candidates, and tend to be viewed as an inherently more accurate measure of such than mere opinion polls (which have to rely on imperfect sampling).

== See also ==
- Availability heuristic
- Compulsory voting
- Cost of Voting Index
- Dictatorship mechanism
- Free-rider problem
- Get out the vote
- Homo reciprocans
- List of close election results
- Median voter theorem
- Rational ignorance
- Strategic voting
- Superrationality
- Political apathy
- Political efficacy
- Tit for tat
- Voter suppression
- Political expressive behaviour
