= Congleton (disambiguation) =

Congleton is a town in Cheshire, England.

Congleton may also refer to:

- Congleton (borough) a former non-metropolitan local government district of Cheshire, England
- Congleton (constituency) an electoral area of North West England represented in the United Kingdom's House of Commons
- Congleton Town F.C., a football club
- Congleton Town Council a town council in Congleton, Cheshire
- Congleton, Kentucky (disambiguation), two settlements in the United States
- Congleton, North Carolina, a settlement in the United States
- Congleton (surname)
