= Political expressive behaviour =

Political action taken to express identity

Political expressive behaviour is political action taken mainly to express who a person is, their identity, values, or group loyalties, rather than to bring about a particular result. Scholars in public choice, political science, and political psychology use the idea to explain forms of political participation, primary voting, that are hard to explain if one assumes people act only to change outcomes, since the probability that one voter will affect the political outcome is negligible. The economist Arye Hillman captured the idea by describing expressive behaviour as the pursuit of personal satisfaction through acts and declarations that confirm a person's sense of who they are.

== Origins and theoretical background ==
The idea was developed to explain a long-standing puzzle in rational choice theory known as the paradox of voting. Because the probability that any single ballot decides a large election approaches zero, a simple cost–benefit analysis of voting has trouble explaining why anyone bothers to turn out at all. Anthony Downs presented the problem in his book, An Economic Theory of Democracy, and William Riker and Peter Ordeshook later gave it a formal treatment.

== Expressive voting theory ==
Expressive voting theory claims that people get satisfaction from two distinct things: taking part in the act of voting, and using their vote to declare support for an outcome they find morally or symbolically appealing, regardless of whether that vote actually shapes who wins.

Geoffrey Brennan and James Buchanan, and later Brennan and the philosopher Loren Lomasky, suggested that perhaps voting is less like buying a product and more like cheering at a football match, that is, an act of support is more important than the result. In their book Democracy and Decision, Brennan and Lomasky argued that because a single vote costs the voter almost nothing in terms of its effect on the outcome, voters are free to indulge their deepest moral or tribal commitments at the ballot box, without the discipline that comes when the consequences of a choice land squarely on the chooser, as they do in ordinary market decisions. Brennan and Alan Hamlin's account of how expressive motives shape electoral equilibrium. They show that as people become more expressive candidates will emphasize higher income, lower taxes, or better services, they may instead emphasize values like patriotism, justice, or morality, because those messages generate expressive satisfaction.

Fishman and Klunover showed that expressive equilibria are characterized by higher turnout and higher aggregate welfare than the instrumental equilibrium. They also find that participation is socially too low under expressive voting, since expressive voting creates a positive externality on other voters by lowering the probability that any given voter is pivotal.

The underlying logic behind the expressive voting theory is sometimes called the "low-cost theory of voting". That is, as an electorate grows, the odds of casting the deciding vote shrink toward zero, so instrumental worries fade away, while the satisfaction of expressing a moral or partisan stance stays exactly the same no matter how many others are voting.

=== Low cost and the freedom to signal virtue ===
The mechanism follows directly from the low-cost logic. When a single vote, a shared post, or a signed petition is unlikely to change anything, the practical price of taking a morally flattering stance drops close to zero, while the reputational and emotional payoff of being seen (by others and by oneself) as principled, compassionate, or loyal remains fully intact. Under those conditions, the "cheapest" thing to do is often to express the most admirable-sounding position. Brennan and Lomasky argued that this asymmetry lets voters treat the ballot as a place to register their ideals rather than to weigh trade-offs, which is comfortable for the individual but can pull collective decisions away from what people would choose if they personally bore the costs. Hillman drew out the broader point: much political expression is a low-cost route to feeling good about oneself, which helps explain why symbolic and identity-affirming positions can attract wide support even when their practical consequences are unpopular or poorly understood.

=== Moral self-signalling ===
A closely related line of research frames the phenomenon as self-signalling: people express opinions partly to send a flattering message to themselves about the kind of person they are. In a survey experiment centred on a Swiss referendum (the so-called "Horncow Initiative," which proposed subsidising farmers who refrain from dehorning cattle), Lydia Mechtenberg, Grischa Perino, Nicolas Treich, Tyran, and Stephanie Wang showed that simply raising the self-image value of a "Yes" vote changed behaviour: participants agreed more with arguments for the initiative, were more likely to say they would vote for it, and reported voting for it more often. Strikingly, boosting the moral "glow" of the vote also shaped which arguments people chose to engage with. This is an evidence that the desire to feel virtuous can steer not just the final choice but the information a person is willing to take in.

== Empirical and experimental research ==
A central difficulty in empirically testing for expressive voting is that, ex post, almost any observed cross-section of votes can be rationalized by some well-behaved instrumental utility function, so credible identification requires either exogenous variation in the probability of casting a pivotal vote or settings in which expressive and instrumental incentives generate divergent predictions.

=== Field and natural experiments ===
Vincent Pons and Clémence Tricaud, exploit an institutional threshold in French parliamentary and cantonal elections: the top two first-round candidates automatically qualify for the runoff, while a third-place candidate qualifies only upon exceeding 12.5% of registered voters. Applying a fuzzy regression discontinuity design around this threshold, they find that the presence of a third candidate in the runoff substantially increases the share of registered citizens who cast a vote and reduces the combined vote share of the top two candidates. The third candidate disproportionately draws support away from the ideologically closest of the top two, causing that candidate's defeat in roughly one-fifth of the affected races, which the authors interpret as evidence that voters value expressing support for their preferred candidate over strategically consolidating behind the acceptable front-runner.

Andreu Arenas studies the ban of the Basque party Batasuna, which continued to contest local elections by calling on supporters to cast null votes, a choice with expressive but no instrumental value since null votes do not translate into council seats. Exploiting heterogeneity in Batasuna's pre-ban strength and in the enforcement of the ban across municipalities and electoral terms, he estimates that null voters accounted for roughly two-thirds of potential Batasuna voters, implying that expressive motivations alone explain about two-thirds of the party's support. Although null votes mechanically lowered the effective electoral threshold, and thus raised the instrumental incentive for others to support small parties, the ban's behavioral effect on the fragmentation of city councils was close to zero.

Stefano DellaVigna, John A. List, Ulrike Malmendier, and Gautam Rao test a distinct expressive channel, social image, through a door-to-door field experiment conducted around the 2010 United States Congressional election. They randomize the informational content and use of a flyer pre-announcing a turnout survey, the survey's duration and payment, and the incentives to misreport past voting, using the resulting variation to structurally estimate a model in which the utility of voting depends on pivotality, warm glow, cost, and anticipated social image. They estimate the value of being able to tell others that one voted at approximately $15 for that election, contributing about two percentage points to turnout, and find suggestive evidence that pre-announcing the turnout question increases participation.

=== Observational tests of divergent predictions ===
Jörg Spenkuch exploits the two-vote structure of the German mixed electoral system, in which the incentive structures of the district ("first") vote and the party-list ("second") vote generate predictions that differ sharply under the pivotal-voter model versus models in which voters derive expressive utility from supporting their most-preferred party. He develops a set of tests pitting these paradigms against one another and concludes that neither can account for the most salient features of the data, and that voters cannot be cleanly partitioned into "sincere" and "strategic" types.

=== Laboratory evidence ===
Emir Kamenica and Louisa Egan Brad test the pivotality logic directly in the laboratory. Motivated by the puzzle of why some lower-income individuals vote against redistribution, they randomly assign subjects either to a referendum procedure, in which each subject's vote may or may not be pivotal, or to a dictatorship procedure, in which a single subject determines the outcome, holding monetary stakes fixed. Contrary to the basic expressive-voting prediction that the influence of monetary self-interest should diminish as the probability of being pivotal falls, they find that pivotality does not moderate the effect of monetary interest on whether subjects vote for redistribution.

Laboratory studies have varied the "electoral" framing of a decision while holding its material stakes fixed, to see whether behaviour shifts in the way the theory predicts. Analyses of real referendums, such as the nuclear freeze votes of the 1980s, have been used to ask whether ballots function more as statements than as decisions with teeth. And survey instruments have been designed to measure "expressiveness" as a personal trait and relate it to how likely someone is to vote.

Jean-Robert Tyran found that the low-cost theory did not predict how people voted. Instead, they tended to approve a morally framed proposal when they expected others to approve it too.

== Related concepts ==
=== Expressive partisanship ===
A parallel and overlapping current in political psychology treats partisanship itself as an expressive social identity rather than, or alongside, an instrumental attachment based on agreement with a party's policies or approval of its performance. Drawing on the social identity theory of Henri Tajfel and John Turner, Donald Green, Bradley Palmquist, and Eric Schickler argued in Partisan Hearts and Minds (2002) that party identification behaves much like other durable social identities, such as religious or ethnic affiliation, and can persist even when a person's policy views drift.

Leonie Huddy, Lilliana Mason, and Lene Aarøe extended this framework, developing a multi-item partisan-identity scale and finding that it predicted campaign involvement and emotional reactions to political news better than measures of ideological or policy commitment.

This work connects to the broader literature on affective polarization, which studies rising emotional hostility between supporters of opposing parties and draws on expressive-identity ideas to explain why partisan attachments can stay firm even as party platforms shift.

== See also ==
- Rational choice theory
- Paradox of voting
- Public choice theory
- Social identity theory
- Party identification
- Affective polarization
- Motivated reasoning
- Virtue signaling
