= Constitutional Political Economy =

- Discipline: Political economics
- Language: English
- Edited by: Roger Congleton, Stefan Voigt

Publication details
- History: 1990–present
- Publisher: Springer Science+Business Media
- Frequency: Quarterly

Standard abbreviations
- ISO 4: Const. Political Econ.

Indexing
- CODEN: CPECFO
- ISSN: 1043-4062 (print); 1572-9966 (web)
- LCCN: 90660275
- OCLC no.: 41558343

Links
- Journal homepage; Online archive

Constitutional Political Economy is a quarterly peer-reviewed academic journal on constitutional economics published by Springer Science+Business Media. It was established in 1990 and appeared triannually, it has been a quarterly since 1996. The editors-in-chief are Roger D. Congleton (West Virginia University) and Stefan Voigt (University of Hamburg).

== History ==
The journal was established in 1990 by Richard E. Wagner and Viktor Vanberg. It was published by the Center for Study of Public Choice until 1995, when Kluwer Academic Publishers took over. Wagner and Vanberg coedited the journal until 1997, when Dennis Mueller joined the editorial team. In 1998, Wagner retired from editorship and was succeeded by Peter Ordeshook. In 2002, Viktor Vanberg retired as editor and was succeeded by Alan Hamlin. Hamlin, Mueller, and Ordeshook coedited the journal until 2013, when Congleton and Voigt took over. Since 2005 the journal has been published by Springer Science+Business Media after its takeover of Kluwer.

== Abstracting and indexing ==
The journal is abstracted and indexed in:

- EBSCO databases
- EconLit
- International Bibliography of Periodical Literature
- International Bibliography of the Social Sciences
- International Political Science Abstracts
- ProQuest databases
- Research Papers in Economics
- Scopus
