= Lara Buchak =

American philosopher (born 1981)

- Born: 1981 (age 44–45)

Education
- Education: Princeton University (PhD), Harvard College (AB)
- Academic advisors: Philip Noel Pettit, Adam Newman Elga

Philosophical work
- Era: 21st-century philosophy
- Region: Western philosophy
- Institutions: Princeton University
- Main interests: decision-making

Lara Buchak (born 1981) is an American philosopher and Professor of Philosophy at Princeton University. She is known for her works on decision-making.

== Books ==
- Risk and Rationality, Oxford, 2013
