= Moral Constitution =

Constitutional interpretation

The Moral Constitution is a means of understanding the U.S. Constitution which emphasizes a fusion of moral philosophy and constitutional law. The most prominent proponent is Ronald Dworkin, who advances the view in Law's Empire and Freedom's Law: The Moral Reading of the American Constitution. Alternatively, it can be taken to mean a constitution that defines the fundamental political principles and establishes the power and duties of each government, and does so while being consistent with a moral code. The moral code can take any of the same forms as the constitution itself: written, unwritten, codified, uncodified, etc. Former Chief Justice of Indonesian Constitutional Court, Jimly Asshiddiqie, also wrote his book on "The Court of Ethics and Constitutional Ethics" (2014) advocating a new perspective on the 'rule of ethics' besides the doctrine of the 'rule of law'.

This interpretation of the Constitution intends to create a change in the application of law and in particular Constitutional Law from a rule of law paradigm to a morality-based paradigm, and would require the explanation and description of the moral code as a principle of operation of the government specified in the constitution as a fundamental component of its structure.

The description of a rule of morality, or moral code can come in two forms. It can be a set of rules, such as the biblical Ten Commandments, and is the form of most legal systems of government today. Alternatively, it can be a set of principles, or a moral code. This alternative definition of a concept of a Moral Constitution finds its only current example in the Bill of Morals efforts of the present government of South Africa.

== See also ==
- Constitutionalism
- Constitutional economics
- Rule according to higher law
