= Alan Hamlin =

British economist and political theorist

Alan Patrick Hamlin (born 25 March 1951) is a British economist and political theorist.

Hamlin attended Bristol Grammar School 1962-69 and earned a bachelor's degree in economics at the University of Wales, followed by a DPhil at the University of York. Hamlin was appointed to a Lectureship in Economics at the University of Southampton in 1976 and was promoted to a Professorship in Economics at Southampton where he was also served as head of the Department of Economics, Dean of Social Sciences, and Dean of Law Arts and Social Sciences. Hamlin was a Visiting Fellow of All Souls College, Oxford, 1989-90 and held visiting appointments in America and in Australia. Hamlin was appointed to a Professorship in Political Theory at the University of Manchester in 2006, where he also served as head of the Department of Politics, and was granted emeritus status in 2013. Hamlin was lead editor of the journal Constitutional Political Economy from 2001 to 2012, served as a Member of the Competition Commission from 2001 - 2010, and was elected a fellow of the Academy of Social Sciences in 2011. Hamlin's publications include 'Ethics Economics and the State' (1986), 'The Good Polity'(1989, with Philip Pettit), 'Democratic Devices and Desires' (2000, with Geoffrey Brennan), 'Beyond Conventional Economics' (2006 with Giuseppe Eusepi).
