= Voter turnout =

Amount of total eligible voters who vote in an election

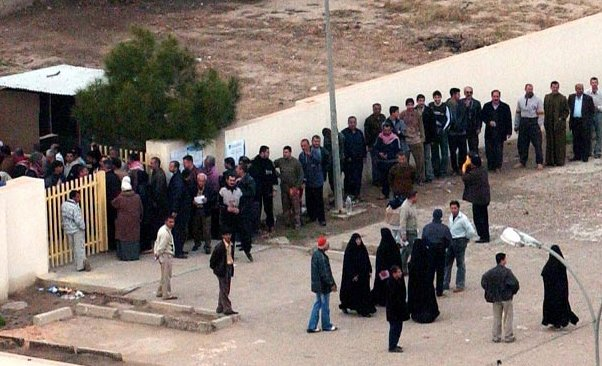
Voters lining up outside a Baghdad polling station during the 2005 Iraqi election. Voter turnout was considered high despite widespread concerns of violence.

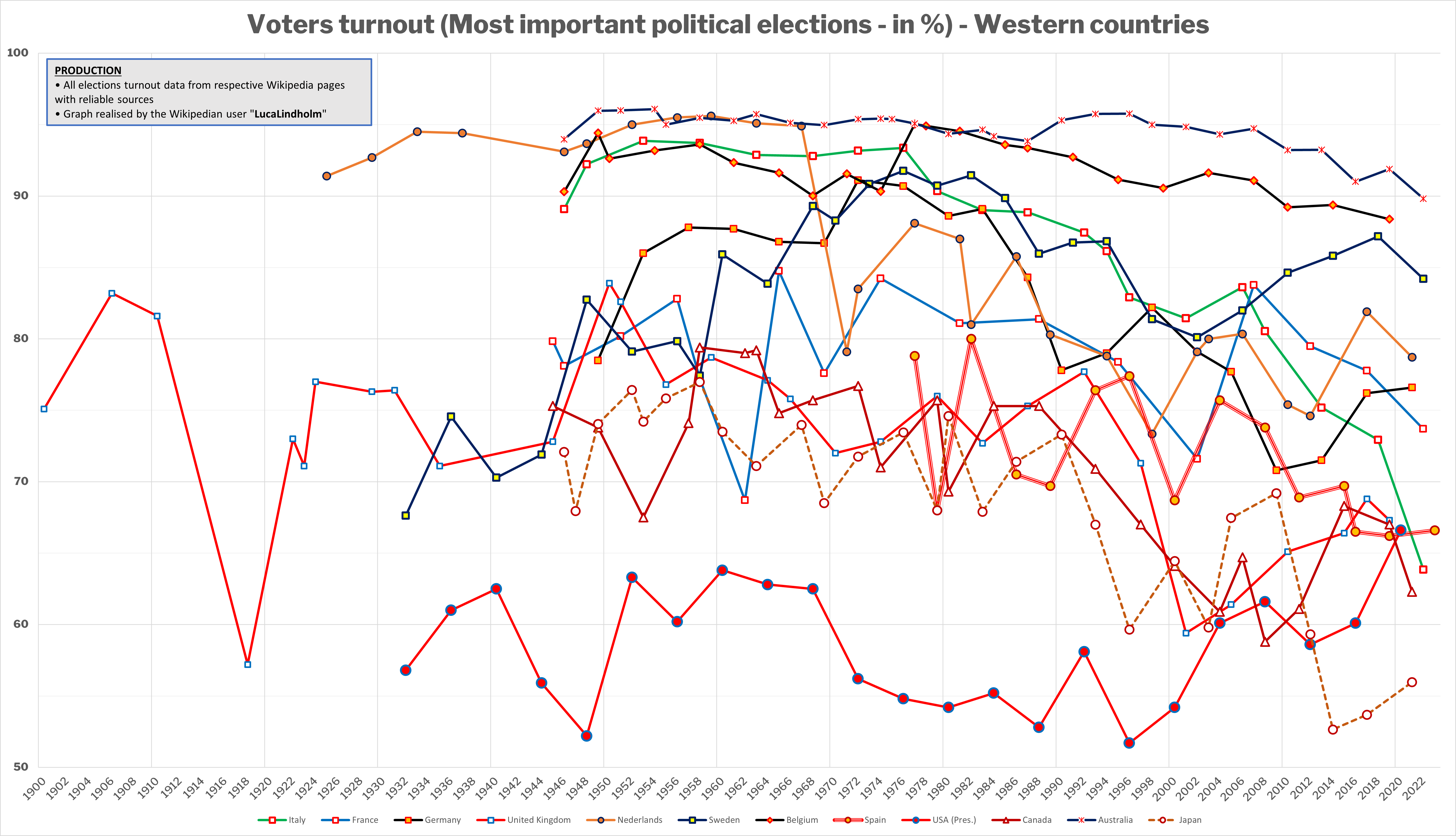
Voter turnout in Western countries elections (in %, starting 1900/1945); more details on file description page

In political science, voter turnout is the participation rate (often defined as those who cast a ballot) of a given election. This is typically either the percentage of registered voters, eligible voters, or all voting-age people. According to Stanford University political scientists Adam Bonica and Michael McFaul, there is a consensus among political scientists that "democracies perform better when more people vote."

Institutional factors drive the vast majority of differences in turnout rates. For example, simpler parliamentary democracies where voters get shorter ballots, fewer elections, and a multi-party system that makes accountability easier see much higher turnout than the systems of the United States, Japan, and Switzerland.

== Significance ==
Some parts of society are more likely to vote than others. As turnout approaches 90%, significant differences between voters and nonvoters lessen, but in lower turnout elections the differences between voters and nonvoters can be dramatic.

More importantly than changes in specific election outcomes, voter turnout has seismic long-term implications on the abilities of democracies to function. For example, regulatory capture tends to afflict low-turnout democracies more, blocking popular democratic reforms like streamlining elections.

== Measuring turnout ==
Differing methods of measuring voter turnout can contribute to reported differences between nations. There are difficulties in measuring both the numerator, the number of voters who cast votes, and the denominator, the number of voters eligible to vote. Surveys can result in inaccurate voter turnout estimates. In Sweden, validated individual-level turnout data is available for a subset of general and European Parliament elections, taken from Swedish election registers.

=== Numerator (e.g. ballots cast) ===
Signed-in: includes people who signed-in at the polls, but did not cast a ballot.

Ballots Cast: Total number of ballots cast, regardless of how many were filled-out or accepted.

Ballots Accepted: this subtracts spoilt votes but in some places includes blank ballots that were otherwise accepted.

Completed Ballots: This metric looks at ballots that were accepted and completed. This is the smallest numerator, but captures only those ballots that will impact the outcome of the election.

For the numerator, it is often assumed that the number of voters who went to the polls should equal the number of ballots cast, which in turn should equal the number of votes counted, but this is not the case. Not all voters who arrive at the polls necessarily cast ballots. Some may be turned away because they are ineligible, some may be turned away improperly, and some who sign the voting register may not actually cast ballots. Furthermore, voters who do cast ballots may abstain, deliberately voting for nobody, or they may spoil their votes, either accidentally or as an act of protest.

In the United Kingdom, the Electoral Commission distinguishes between "valid vote turnout", which excludes spoilt ballots, and "ballot box turnout", which does not.

In the United States, it has been common to report turnout as the sum of votes for the top race on the ballot, because not all jurisdictions report the actual number of people who went to the polls nor the number of undervotes or overvotes. Overvote rates of around 0.3 percent are typical of well-run elections, but in Gadsden County,Florida, the overvote rate was 11 percent in November 2000.

=== Denominator (out of people) ===
Total population: everyone who lives in a place, regardless of age, citizenship status or other factors that affect voting eligibility. This has the advantage of being an accessible indicator of how close a place may be to universal suffrage.

Voting-age population: everyone above the legal voting age in a country regardless of citizenship status or other factors that might affect voting eligibility. This has the advantage of being easier to measure than 'eligible voters.'

Eligible voters: This measures all the voters allowed to vote under current law, which in some places includes people who have not registered or re-registered to vote. This is more difficult to measure as more categories of people are disenfranchised and can include non-resident voters.

Registered voters: This measurement captures all who are registered to vote. This has the advantage of being easy to measure and readily accessible, though overlooks those who are unwilling or unable to register due to barriers such as a complex registration or re-registration process.

In the United States, for example, there is no accurate registry of exactly who is eligible to vote, since only about 70–75% of people choose to register themselves. Thus, turnout has to be calculated based on population estimates. Some political scientists have argued that these measures do not properly account for the large number of legal permanent residents (green card holders), undocumented immigrants, disenfranchised felons and persons who are considered 'mentally incompetent' in the United States. Voter turnout everywhere would be higher if measured by eligibility and not voting-age population.

Even in countries with fewer restrictions on the franchise, voting age population turnout data can still be impacted by large numbers of non-citizen residents and non-resident citizens voting, often under-reporting turnout by as much as 10 percentage points. Professor Michael P. McDonald constructed an estimation of the turnout against the 'voting eligible population' (VEP), instead of the 'voting age population' (VAP). For the American presidential elections of 2004, turnout could then be expressed as 60.32% of voting eligible population, rather than 55.27% of voting age population.

In New Zealand, registration is supposed to be universal. This does not eliminate uncertainty in the eligible population because this system has been shown to be unreliable, with a large number of eligible but unregistered citizens creating inflated turnout figures.

== Factors ==
Various factors have an impact on voter turnout. Making voting compulsory has a direct and dramatic effect on turnout while adding barriers, such as a separate registration process or unnecessarily scheduling many elections, suppresses turnout. In addition, the closer democracies are to 'one person, one vote' increases turnout as voters see that their effort has an impact. This can be seen in the higher turnout rates of proportional parliamentary democracies.

For some time, the Gallup Organization has utilized a metric of polls to determine who would vote. These polls would look at "intention to vote, registration status, reported frequency of past voting, awareness of where to vote, interest in politics in general, interest in the particular election, and intensity of candidate preference."

Since around 1985, there appears to be a gradual decrease in voter turnout globally when looking at the voting-age population. However, a 2001 article in the American Political Science Review, Michael McDonald and Samuel Popkin argued, that at least in the United States, voter turnout since 1972 has not actually declined when calculated for those eligible to vote, what they term the voting-eligible population. In 1972, noncitizens and ineligible felons (depending on state law) constituted about 2% of the voting-age population. By 2004, ineligible voters constituted nearly 10%. Ineligible voters are not evenly distributed across the country – 20% of California's voting-age population is ineligible to vote – which confounds comparisons of states. Furthermore, they argue that an examination of the Census Bureau's Current Population Survey shows that turnout is low but not declining among the youth, when the high youth turnout of 1972 (the first year 18- to 20-year-olds were eligible to vote in most states) is removed from the trendline.

Other forms of political participation have declined, such as voluntary participation in political parties and the attendance of observers at town meetings. Meanwhile, church attendance, membership in professional, fraternal, and student societies, youth groups, and parent-teacher associations has also declined. Some argue that technological developments in society such as "automobilization," suburban living, and "an explosive proliferation of home entertainment devices" have contributed to a loss of community, which in turn has weakened participation in civic life. Putnam argued increased television viewing might directly account for up to half the drop in social capital in the US. At the same time, some forms of participation have increased. People have become far more likely to participate in boycotts, demonstrations, and to donate to political campaigns.

Many causes have been proposed for what some see as a decline in voter participation though all offered in this section are heavily disputed. When asked why they do not vote, many people report that they have too little free time. James Sherk, member of conservative think-tank The Heritage Foundation asserted that studies have consistently shown that the amount of leisure time has not decreased, even if the perception of less leisure time results in less participation. While wages and employment decrease voter turnout in gubernatorial elections, they appear to not affect national races. Geographic mobility has increased over the last few decades, bringing barriers to voting in a district where one is a recent arrival, including knowing little about the local candidates and issues. It has been argued that democratic consolidation (the stabilization of new democracies) contributes to the decline in voter turnout. A 2017 study challenges this, however.

=== Ease of voting ===
Other methods of making voting easier to increase turnout include vote-by-mail, absentee polling and improved access to polls, such as increasing the number of possible voting locations, lowering the average time voters wait in line, or requiring companies to give workers some time off on voting day. A 2017 study found that turnout among older voters increases the earlier polling places open, while turnout among younger voters improves the longer polling places stay open.

A 2017 study in Electoral Studies found that Swiss cantons that reduced the costs of postal voting for voters by prepaying the postage on return envelopes (which otherwise cost 85 Swiss Franc cents) were "associated with a statistically significant 1.8 percentage point increase in voter turnout". A 2016 study in the American Journal of Political Science found that preregistration – allowing young citizens to register before being eligible to vote – increased turnout by 2 to 8 percentage points. A 2019 study in Social Science Quarterly found that the introduction of a vote‐by‐mail system in Washington state led to an increase in turnout. Another 2019 study in Social Science Quarterly found that online voter registration increased voter turnout, in particular for young voters. A 2020 study in Political Behavior found that a single postcard by election officials to unregistered eligible voters boosted registration rates by a percentage point and turnout by 0.9 percentage points, with the strongest effects on young, first-time voters.

The availability of ballot drop boxes increases turnout.

A 2018 study in the British Journal of Political Science found that internet voting in local elections in Ontario, Canada, only had a modest impact on turnout, increasing turnout by 3.5 percentage points. The authors of the study say that the results "suggest that internet voting is unlikely to solve the low turnout crisis, and imply that cost arguments do not fully account for recent turnout declines."

=== Voter fatigue ===
If there are many elections in close succession, voter turnout tends to decrease as the public tires of participating. In low-turnout Switzerland, the average voter is invited to go to the polls an average of seven times a year; the United States has frequent elections, with two votes per year on average (e.g. local government and primaries). Eliminating off-cycle elections boosts turnout while being popular with voters. Another form of voter fatigue occurs when voters are asked to weigh-in on dozens of contests, as occurs in some parts of the United States.

=== Voter registration ===
In the United States and most Latin American nations, voters must go through separate voter registration procedures before they are allowed to vote. This two-step process quite clearly decreases turnout. US states with no, or easier, registration requirements have larger turnouts.

A country with a highly efficient registration process is France. At the age of eighteen, all youth are automatically registered. Only new residents and citizens who have moved are responsible for bearing the costs and inconvenience of updating their registration. Similarly, in Nordic countries, all citizens and residents are included in the official population register, which is simultaneously a tax list, voter registration, and membership in the universal health system. Residents are required by law to report any change of address to the register within a short time after moving. This is also the system in Germany (but without the membership in the health system). Spain has also a similar system called "Padrón Municipal de Habitantes", held by municipalities. Persons register themselves in the Padrón as local residents (every resident in Spain must be registered in any municipality). The Padrón is used for providing most local, regional, and national government services. It also serves as the electoral register. In order to avoid duplications and to gather statistics on demography, the Padrón is supervised by a national government agency, the Instituto National de Estatística (INE). La Oficina Electoral del Censo is the bureau, as part of the INE, responsible for compiling the electoral roll. Every Spanish citizen or EU resident, older than 18 years, is automatically included in the voter register.

=== Compulsory voting ===
A strong factor affecting voter turnout is whether voting is compulsory, as countries that enforce compulsory voting tend to have far higher voter turnout rates. For example, in Australia, voter registration and attendance at a polling booth have been mandatory since the 1920s, with the 2016 federal election having turnout figures of 91% for the House of Representatives and 91.9% for the Senate. In Singapore, turnout at the 2020 general election was 95.81%, the highest since 1997 where it was 95.91%. This was an increase from the record low of 93.06% at the 2011 general election.

Penalties for failing to vote are not always strictly enforced, and sanctions for non-voters are often mild. For instance, while voting is nominally compulsory in Greece for adults up to 70 years of age, no one has ever been prosecuted for failing to vote, with voter turnout rates reaching as low as 57% in the September 2015 Greek legislative election. In Australia, people who do not vote are subject to a small fine, which is easily waived if one of many acceptable excuses for failing to vote is provided. In Bolivia, however, if a voter fails to participate in an election, they may be denied withdrawal of their salary from the bank for three months.

=== Salience ===
Mark N. Franklin argues that salience, the perceived effect that an individual vote will have on how the country is run, has a significant effect on turnout. He presents Switzerland as an example of a nation with low salience. The nation's administration is highly decentralized, so that the federal government has limited powers. Important decisions are also placed before the population in a referendum. Individual votes for the federal legislature are thus less likely to have a significant effect on the complex web of systems, which probably explains some of the low average turnouts in that more complicated democracy. By contrast Malta, with one of the world's highest voter turnouts, has a single legislature that holds most political power. Malta has a two-party system in which a small swing in votes can significantly alter the executive. Voters' perceptions of fairness also have an important effect on salience, where fears of fraud and corruption can suppress turnout. Minority voters are shown to mobilize when issues pertaining to their group identity become politically salient.

A 2017 experimental study found that by sending registered voters between the ages of 18 and 30 a voter guide containing salient information about candidates in an upcoming election (a list of candidate endorsements and the candidates' policy positions on five issues in the campaign) increased turnout by 0.9 points. Voting advice applications have strong evidence to increase voter turnout and vote choice and moderate evidence to increase voting knowledge.

A 2018 study found that "young people who pledge to vote are more likely to turn out than those who are contacted using standard Get-Out-the-Vote materials. Overall, pledging to vote increased voter turnout by 3.7 points among all subjects and 5.6 points for people who had never voted before."

=== Proportionality ===
Since most votes count in proportional representation systems, there are fewer "wasted votes", so voters, aware that their vote can make a difference, are more likely to make the effort to vote, and less likely to vote tactically. Compared to countries with plurality electoral systems, voter turnout improves and the population is more involved in the political process in ~70% of cases. The exceptions to the rule can include cases where a plurality system has an unusually high number of competitive districts, for example, before it transitions to a proportional one.

=== Paradox of voting ===
The chance of any one vote determining the outcome is low. Some studies show that a single vote in a voting scheme such as the Electoral College in the United States has an even lower chance of determining the outcome. Other studies claim that the Electoral College actually increases voting power. Studies using game theory, which takes into account the ability of voters to interact, have also found that the expected turnout for any large election should be zero.

The basic formula for determining whether someone will vote, on the questionable assumption that people act completely rationally, is

$$PB + D > C,$$

where

- P is the probability that an individual's vote will affect the outcome of an election,
- B is the perceived benefit that would be received if that person's favored political party or candidate were elected,
- D originally stood for democracy or civic duty, but today represents any social or personal gratification an individual gets from voting, and
- C is the time, effort, and financial cost involved in voting.

Since P is virtually zero in most elections, PB may be also near zero, and D is thus the most important element in motivating people to vote. For a person to vote, these factors must outweigh C. Experimental political science has found that even when P is likely greater than zero, this term has no effect on voter turnout. Enos and Fowler (2014) conducted a field experiment that exploits the rare opportunity of a tied election for major political office. Informing citizens that the special election to break the tie will be close (meaning a high P term) has little mobilizing effect on voter turnout.

Riker and Ordeshook developed the modern understanding of D. They listed five major forms of gratification that people receive for voting: complying with the social obligation to vote; affirming one's allegiance to the political system; affirming a partisan preference (also known as expressive voting, or voting for a candidate to express support, not to achieve any outcome); affirming one's importance to the political system; and, for those who find politics interesting and entertaining, researching and making a decision. Other political scientists have since added other motivators and questioned some of Riker and Ordeshook's assumptions. All of these concepts are inherently imprecise, making it difficult to discover exactly why people choose to vote.

Recently, several scholars have considered the possibility that B includes not only a personal interest in the outcome, but also a concern for the welfare of others in the society (or at least other members of one's favorite group or party). In particular, experiments in which subject altruism was measured using a dictator game showed that concern for the well-being of others is a major factor in predicting turnout and political participation. This motivation is distinct from D, because voters must think others benefit from the outcome of the election, not their act of voting in and of itself.

=== Habit ===
Turnout differences appear to persist over time; in fact, the strongest predictor of individual turnout is whether or not one voted in the previous election. As a result, many scholars think of turnout as habitual behavior that can be learned or unlearned, especially among young adults.

=== Childhood influences ===
Studies have found that improving children's social skills and enrolling them in high-quality early-childhood educational programs increases their turnout as adults.

=== Demographics ===
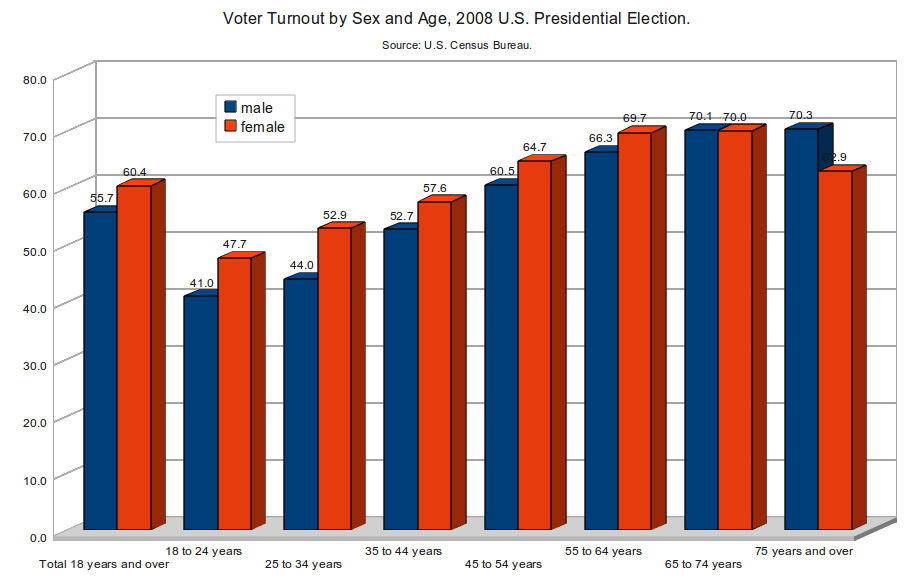
Voter turnout for the 2008 U.S. Presidential Election by age and sex

Voter turnout tends to increase significantly with age. In some countries women below 40 have higher voter turnouts compared to men below 40, while this gender gap can reverse at higher age.

Some view that ethnicity and race have little effect when education and income differences are taken into account.

A 2018 study found that while education did not increase turnout on average, it did raise turnout among individuals from low socioeconomic status households. Occupation has little effect on turnout, with the notable exception of higher voting rates among government employees in many countries.

There can also be regional differences in voter turnout. One issue that arises in continent-spanning nations, such as Australia, Canada, the United States and Russia, is that of time zones. Canada banned the broadcasting of election results in any region where the polls have not yet closed; this ban was upheld by the Supreme Court of Canada.

=== Differences between elections ===
Within countries there can be important differences in turnout between individual elections. Elections where control of the national executive is not at stake generally have much lower turnouts—often half that for general elections. Off-year municipal and provincial elections, and by-elections to fill casual vacancies, typically have lower turnouts, as do elections for the parliament of the supranational European Union, which is separate from the executive branch of the EU's government. In the United States, midterm congressional elections attract far lower turnouts than Congressional elections held concurrently with Presidential ones. Runoff elections also tend to attract lower turnouts.

=== Competitiveness of races ===
In theory, one of the factors that is most likely to increase turnout is a close race. Following the Downsian Closeness hypothesis and the idea of instrumental voting, voters rationally estimate the costs and benefits of participating in an election. Benefits exceed the costs if a close outcome of the election is expected and voters believe their ballot may be decisive for the outcome. Additionally, in these elections parties increase their mobilization efforts. Although the logic of instrumental voting applies to all elections, the effects are more prominent in democracies and majoritarian electoral systems.

An example is the 2004 U.S. presidential election. With an intensely polarized electorate and all polls showing a close finish between President George W. Bush and Democratic challenger John F. Kerry, the turnout in the election was close to 60%, resulting in a record number of popular votes for both candidates (around 62 million for Bush and 59 million for Kerry). However, this race also demonstrates the influence that contentious social issues can have on voter turnout; for example, the voter turnout rate in 1860 wherein anti-slavery candidate Abraham Lincoln won the election was the second-highest on record (81.2 percent, second only to 1876, with 81.8 percent). Nonetheless, there is evidence to support the argument that predictable election results—where one vote is not seen to be able to make a difference—have resulted in lower turnouts, such as Bill Clinton's 1996 re-election (which featured the lowest voter turnout in the United States since 1924), the United Kingdom general election of 2001, and the 2005 Spanish referendum on the European Constitution; all of these elections produced decisive results on a low turnout.

A 2020 NBER paper, examining evidence from Swiss referendums, found that an awareness by the electorate that an election would be close increased turnout. Controlling for canton and vote fixed effects, the study determined "that greater cantonal newspaper coverage of close polls significantly increases voter turnout"

=== Previous incarceration ===
One 2017 study in the Journal of Politics found that, in the United States, incarceration had no significant impact on turnout in elections: ex-felons did not become less likely to vote after their time in prison. Also in the United States, incarceration, probation, and a felony record deny 5–6 million Americans of the right to vote, with reforms gradually leading more states to allow people with felony criminal records to vote, while almost none allow incarcerated people to vote.

=== Weather and timing ===
Research results are mixed as to whether bad weather affects turnout. There is research that shows that precipitation can reduce turnout, though this effect is generally rather small, with most studies finding each millimeter of rainfall to reduce turnout by 0.015 to 0.1 percentage points. At least two studies, however, found no evidence that weather disruptions reduce turnout. A 2011 study found "that while rain decreases turnout on average, it does not do so in competitive elections." Some research has also investigated the effect of temperature on turnout, with some finding increased temperatures to moderately increase turnout. Some other studies, however, found temperature to have no significant impact on turnout. These variations in turnout can also have partisan impacts; a 2017 study in the journal American Politics Research found that rainfall increased Republican vote shares, because it decreased turnout more among Democratic voters than Republican voters. Studies from the Netherlands and Germany have also found weather-related turnout decreases to benefit the right, while a Spanish study found a reverse relationship.

The season and the day of the week (although many nations hold all their elections on the same weekday) can also affect turnout. Weekend and summer elections find more of the population on holiday or uninterested in politics, and have lower turnouts. When nations set fixed election dates, these are usually midweek during the spring or autumn to maximize turnout. Variations in turnout between elections tend to be insignificant. It is extremely rare for factors such as competitiveness, weather, and time of year to cause an increase or decrease in turnout of more than five percentage points, far smaller than the differences between groups within society, and far smaller than turnout differentials between nations.

=== Household socialization ===
A 2018 study in the American Political Science Review found that the parents to newly enfranchised voters "become 2.8 percentage points more likely to vote." A 2018 study in the journal Political Behavior found that increasing the size of households increases a household member's propensity to vote.

A 2018 PlosOne study found that a "partisan who is married to a co-partisan is more likely to vote. This phenomenon is especially pronounced for partisans in closed primaries, elections in which non-partisan registered spouses are ineligible to participate."

=== Ballot secrecy ===
According to a 2018 study, get-out-the-vote groups in the United States who emphasize ballot secrecy along with reminders to vote increase turnout by about 1 percentage point among recently registered nonvoters.

=== Abstention ===
There are philosophical, moral, and practical reasons that some people cite for not voting in electoral politics, typically owing to obstacles to voting, though some of the practical reasons for abstention have more to do with rare, difficult to predict situations arising from flaws in the design of the voting system that fail to efficiently capture voter preferences.

== Increasing voter turnout ==
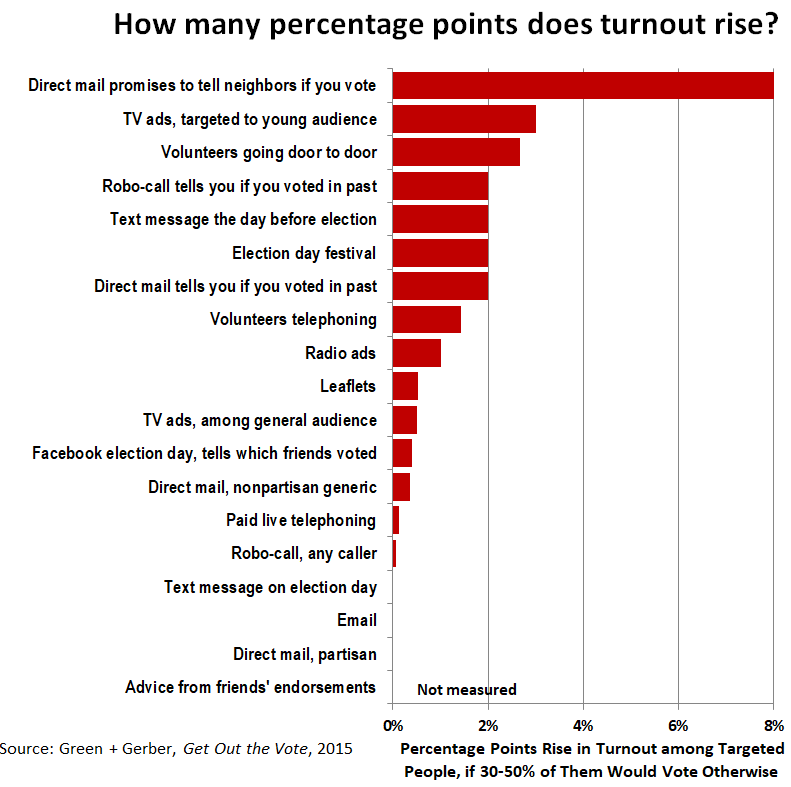
Methods of raising turnout

Various measures have been proposed to attempt to increase voter turnout. One of these is to make election days national holidays in order to give potential voters more time and freedom to vote. This has been implemented in multiple democracies of which have higher voter turnouts than the U.S., which does not make elections days national holidays.

Voter registration has been found to be a barrier to democratic participation. Therefore, another measure cited to boost election turnout is to have automatic voter registration, a measure that has been implemented in various democracies around the world. Studies have shown that increased voter registration leads to greater turnout at elections.

Another proposed measure to increase voter turnout is a move to a proportional representation system for countries that currently use first-past-the-post in elections. Countries that use proportional representation systems have higher turnouts when compared to those that do not. The reasoning that has been given for this is that voters feel they "are given a more meaningful choice at the ballot box" and that a proportional electoral system leads to greater voter representation.

Some have found that mail voting raises turnout in local elections, by letting voters know an election is happening and making it easier to vote. Mail voting has mixed effects on bigger elections.

== Voter turnout by country ==
Voter turnout at Australian federal elections (%)
Year	Senate	House
1983	94.64	94.64
1984	94.55 ▼	94.19 ▼
1987	94.34 ▼	93.84 ▼
1990	95.81 ▲	95.31 ▲
1993	96.22 ▲	95.75 ▲
1996	96.20 ▼	95.77 ▲
1998	95.34 ▼	94.99 ▼
2001	95.20 ▼	94.85 ▼
2004	94.82 ▼	94.32 ▼
2007	95.17 ▲	94.76 ▲
2010	93.83 ▼	93.22 ▼
2013	93.88 ▲	93.23 ▲
2016	91.93 ▼	91.01 ▼
2019	92.48 ▲	91.89 ▲
2022	90.47 ▼	89.82 ▼
2025	90.68 ▲	90.67 ▲
Source: Australian; Electoral Commission

Voter turnout varies considerably between nations. One dataset with voter turnouts by country and election is the Election turnout indicator in V-Dem Democracy indices. It tends to be lower in North America, Asia and Latin America than in most of Europe and Oceania. Based on all parliamentary elections between 1945 and 1997, Western Europe averages a 77% turnout, and South and Central America around 54%. The differences between nations tend to be greater than those between classes, ethnic groups, or regions within nations. Confusingly, some of the factors that cause internal differences do not seem to apply on a global level. For instance, nations with better-educated populaces do not have higher turnouts. There are two main commonly cited causes of these international differences: culture and institutions. However, there is much debate over the relative impact of the various factors.

Indonesia, which before 1998 always had a high percentage of voter (more than 87%) but then dip down to low 70% in the 2014, saw a record breaking voters in the 2019 Indonesian general election with more than 158 million people cast their ballots on the same day, and has been called "the world's most complex one-day elections".

Wealth and literacy have some effect on turnout, but are not reliable measures. Countries such as Angola and Ethiopia have long had high turnouts, but so have the wealthy states of Europe. The United Nations Human Development Index shows some correlation between higher standards of living and higher turnout. The age of a democracy is also an important factor. Elections require considerable involvement by the population, and it takes some time to develop the cultural habit of voting, and the associated understanding of and confidence in the electoral process. This factor may explain the lower turnouts in the newer democracies of Eastern Europe and Latin America. Much of the impetus to vote comes from a sense of civic duty, which takes time and certain social conditions that can take decades to develop:

- trust in government;
- degree of partisanship among the population;
- interest in politics, and
- belief in the political efficacy of voting.

Demographics also have an effect. Older people tend to vote more than youths, so societies where the average age is somewhat higher, such as Europe; have higher turnouts than somewhat younger countries such as the United States. Populations that are more mobile and those that have lower marriage rates tend to have lower turnout. In countries that are highly multicultural and multilingual, it can be difficult for national election campaigns to engage all sectors of the population.

The nature of elections also varies between nations. In the United States, negative campaigning and character attacks are more common than elsewhere, potentially suppressing turnouts. The focus placed on get out the vote efforts and mass-marketing can have important effects on turnout. Partisanship is an important impetus to turnout, with the highly partisan more likely to vote. Turnout tends to be higher in nations where political allegiance is closely linked to class, ethnic, linguistic, or religious loyalties. Countries where multiparty systems have developed also tend to have higher turnouts. Nations with a party specifically geared towards the working class will tend to have higher turnouts among that class than in countries where voters have only big tent parties, which try to appeal to all the voters, to choose from. A four-wave panel study conducted during the 2010 Swedish national election campaign showed clear differences in media use between age groups, and that political social media use and attention to political news in traditional media increase political engagement over time. Social media is not always used effectively and may sometimes have a negative impact on the results of the election. In the United States, Barack Obama utilized Facebook to his benefit during his first run for presidency and jumpstarted the use of social media in political campaigns. The utilization of social media, and perhaps the negative impacts that social media have on campaigns, were seen in the 2020 United States election.

=== United States ===
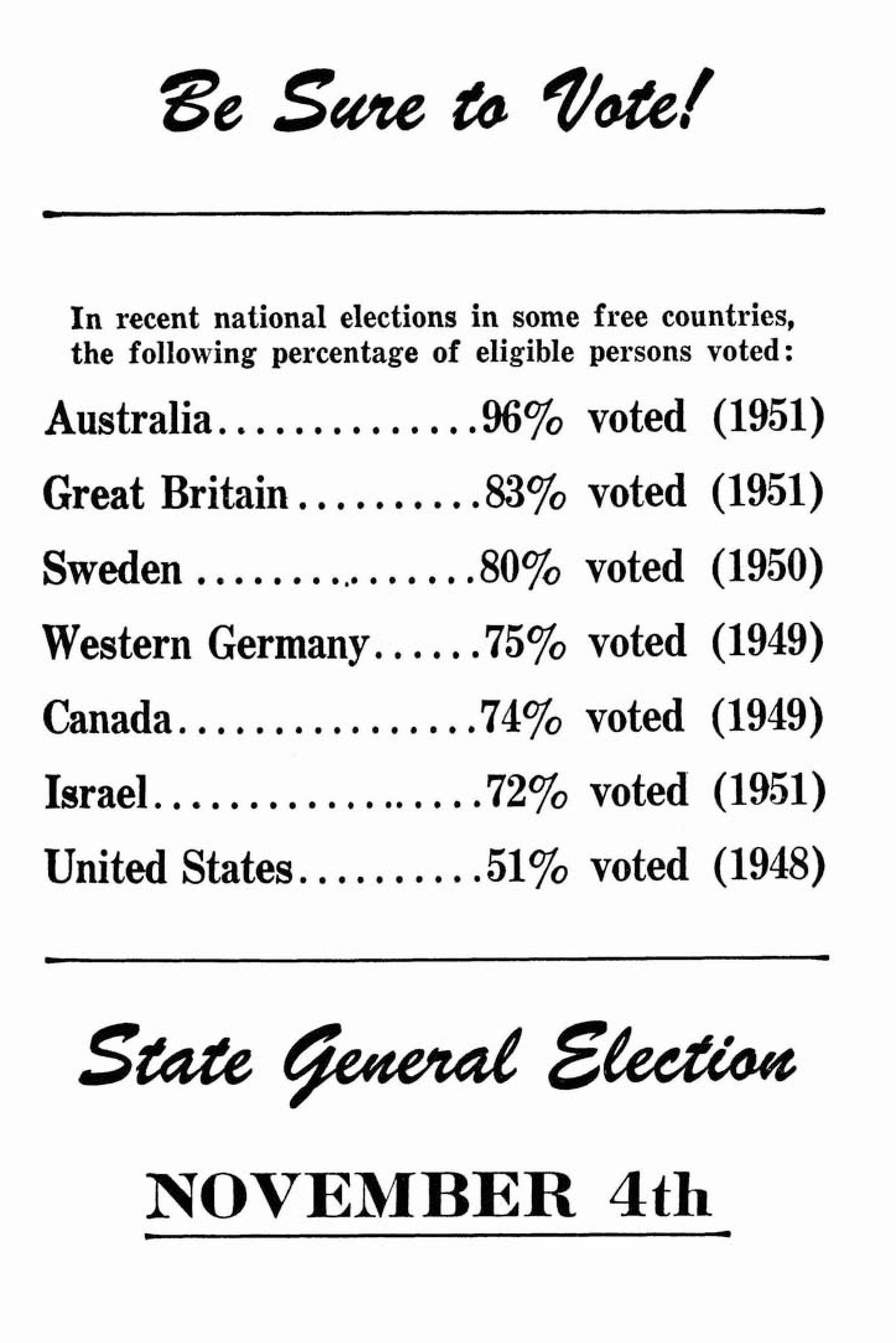
Page from a 1952 United States voters' pamphlet comparing voter turnout in various countries

Rosenstone and Hansen contend that there is a decline in turnout in the United States and that it is the product of a change in campaigning strategies as a result of the so-called new media. Before the introduction of television, almost all of a party's resources would be directed towards intensive local campaigning and get out the vote initiatives. In the modern era, these resources have been redirected to expensive media campaigns in which the potential voter is a passive participant. During the same period, negative campaigning has become ubiquitous in the United States and elsewhere and has been shown to impact voter turnout. Attack ads and smear campaigns give voters a negative impression of the entire political process. The evidence for this is mixed: elections involving highly unpopular incumbents generally have high turnout; some studies have found that mudslinging and character attacks reduce turnout, but that substantive attacks on a party's record can increase it. To counter this, programs such as MTV's "Rock the Vote" and the "Vote or Die" initiatives have been introduced to increase turnouts of those between the ages of 18 and 25. A number of governments and electoral commissions have also launched efforts to boost turnout. For instance, Elections Canada has launched mass media campaigns to encourage voting prior to elections, as have bodies in Taiwan and the United Kingdom.

Structural differences between democracies, including the complexity of the system and ease of voting are more often used to explain differences in turnout between nations, with United States voters in particular suffering from a complicated maze of federalism and separation of powers that is relatively unique among democracies. The Brennan Center for Justice reported that in 2016 fourteen states passed restrictive voting laws. Examples of these laws are photo ID mandates, narrow times for early voting, and limitations on voter registration. Barbour and Wright also believe that one of the causes is restrictive voting laws but they call this system of laws regulating the electorate. The Constitution gives states the power to make decisions regarding restrictive voting laws. In 2008 the Supreme Court made a crucial decision regarding Indiana's voter ID law in saying that it does not violate the constitution. Since then almost half of the states have passed restrictive voting laws. These laws contribute to Barbour and Wrights idea of the rational nonvoter. This is someone who does not vote because the benefits of them not voting outweighs the cost to vote. These laws add to the "cost" of voting, or reason that make it more difficult and to vote.

Google extensively studied the causes behind low voter turnout in the United States, and argues that one of the key reasons behind lack of voter participation is the so-called "interested bystander". According to Google's study, 48.9% of adult Americans can be classified as "interested bystanders", as they are politically informed but are reticent to involve themselves in the civic and political sphere. This category is not limited to any socioeconomic or demographic groups. Google theorizes that individuals in this category suffer from political apathy, as they are interested in political life but believe that their individual effect would be negligible. These individuals often participate politically on the local level, but shy away from national elections.
