= The Economy of Esteem =

Book by Geoffrey Brennan

The Economy of Esteem: An Essay on Civil and Political Society
- Author: Geoffrey Brennan, Philip Pettit
- Language: English
- Publisher: OUP Oxford
- Publication date: 2004
- ISBN: 9780199289813

The Economy of Esteem is a book by Geoffrey Brennan and Philip Pettit describing the role of self-esteem and honour in the economy. It was published in 2004 by Oxford University Press.

According to WorldCat, the book is held in 466 libraries. It has been reviewed by in Politics, Philosophy & Economics, by Bo Rothstein in Perspectives in Politics in Politische Vierteljahresschrift, in Ethics, in Journal of Economics, in Economics and Philosophy, in Journal of European Social Policy, and in L'Année sociologique

According to Brennan, others who have historically paid attention to the role of esteem in motivation range "from Cicero and Polybius through Thomas Aquinas to Hobbes, Locke, Montesquieu, Hume, the American Founding Fathers, Kant, and notably Adam Smith", although Brennan argues that modern 'invisible hand' economics neglects the importance of esteem. Esteem is unique among currencies because it cannot be traded ("esteem is necessarily produced under conditions of autarky") and is subject to the paradox of hedonism.
