= Altruism theory of voting =

The altruism theory of voting is a model of voter behavior which states that if citizens in a democracy have "social" preferences for the welfare of others, the extremely low probability of a single vote determining an election will be outweighed by the large cumulative benefits society will receive from the voter's preferred policy being enacted, such that it is rational for an “altruistic” citizen, who receives utility from helping others, to vote. Altruistic voting has been compared to purchasing a lottery ticket, in which the probability of winning is extremely low but the payoff is large enough that the expected benefit outweighs the cost.

Since the failure of standard rational choice models—which assume voters have "selfish" preferences—to explain voter turnout in large elections, public choice economists and social scientists have increasingly turned to altruism as a way to explain why rational individuals would choose to vote despite its apparent lack of individual benefit, explaining the paradox of voting. The theory suggests that individual voters do, in fact, derive personal utility from influencing the outcome of elections in favor of the candidate that they believe will implement policies for the greater good of the entire population.

== The rational calculus of voting ==
=== The "selfish" rationale for voting ===
The standard model of voter calculus was articulated by Riker and Ordeshook in their 1968 article "A Theory of the Calculus of Voting" in The American Political Science Review. The basic utility hypothesis for the calculus of voting they gave was:

R = (BP) − C

Where B is the expected differential utility a voter personally receives from his preferred candidate winning; P is the probability of the voter bringing about B (that is, turning the election for his preferred candidate); C is the individual's cost of voting in the election; and R is the individual's expected reward from voting. If R > 0, then the expected utility of voting outweighs its costs, and it is reasonable to vote. But if R ≤ 0, the costs outweigh the benefits and a strictly rational individual would not be expected to vote.

Because P, the probability of any one vote determining the outcome, is extremely small for any large election, the expected benefits of voting under the traditional rational choice model is always roughly equal to zero. This leads to the so-called paradox of voting, in which rational choice models of voter behavior predict tiny turnouts which simply do not occur. In all democracies, voter turnout exceeds what the basic rational choice models predict.

==== Expressive versus instrumental voting ====
Because simple selfishness cannot explain why large numbers of people consistently choose to vote, Riker and Ordeshook introduced another term to the equation, D, to symbolize the personal or social benefits conferred by the act of voting itself, rather than by affecting the outcome of the election.

R = (BP) − C + D

This drew a distinction between expressive voting, intended only to signal support or demonstrate civic responsibility, and instrumental voting, intended to actually change the outcome. The benefits here did not come from actually influencing the election, but rather from the social payoffs of participating in it. Because the term BP was assumed to be zero, D was presumed to be the only important factor in determining elections.

=== The "altruistic" rationale for voting ===
Because of the multitude of different and contradictory definitions of expressive voting, recently another effort by political scientists and public choice theorists has been made to explain voting behavior with reference to instrumental benefits received from influencing the outcome of the election. If voters assumed to be rational but also to have altruistic tendencies and some preference for outcomes enhancing the social welfare of others, they will reliably vote in favor of the policies they perceive to be for the common good, rather than for their individual benefit.

In his paper "Altruism and Turnout," James H. Fowler explained how the altruistic theory modified the calculus of voting:

Scholars incorporate altruism into the traditional calculus of voting model by assuming that a citizen also cares about the benefits that others secure from the preferred outcome (Edlin, Gelman, and Kaplan 2006; Jankowski 2002, 2004). Under this assumption, B is a function not only of direct benefits to oneself BS, but to the N other people affected by the outcome of the election who would gain an average benefit BO if the citizen’s preferred alternative won. It also depends on how much the citizen cares about benefits to others, which is labeled a for altruism.
These assumptions transform the calculus of voting to P(BS + aNBO) > C.
...There is by now a substantial literature in economics, sociology, biology, psychology, and political science yielding evidence that human beings are also motivated by the welfare of others (Fehr and Fischbacher 2003; Monroe 1998; Piliavin and Charng 1990). Specifically, people frequently engage in acts of altruism by choosing to bear costs in order to provide benefits to others.

Essentially, voters behave altruistically by absorbing the cost of voting in order to provide society with the benefits of their preferred policy, although the expected reward of voting under this model is greater than zero (and thus still a rational decision) because of voters' altruistic social preferences. Edlin, et al., found in their study of altruistic behavior among voters,

... [F]or an individual with both selfish and social preferences, the social preferences will dominate and make it rational for a typical person to vote even in large elections;(2) to show that rational socially-motivated voting has a feedback mechanism that stabilizes turnout at reasonable levels (e.g., 50% of the electorate)...

Their findings suggest that in a large election, altruistic preferences will trump selfish tendencies, thus encouraging a stable voter turnout that closely mirrors the observed rate in western democracies.

== Voter's altruistic preferences ==
In his 2007 book The Myth of the Rational Voter: Why Democracies Choose Bad Policies, George Mason University economist Bryan Caplan argued that, all else equal, voters do not, in fact, choose policies based on self-interest. The rich are not more likely to support policies that personally benefit them, like lower marginal rates, and the poor are not more likely to oppose welfare reform.

He claims that what he calls the "Self-Interest Voter Hypothesis" (SIVH), the theory that individuals' policy preferences are narrowly selfish, is empirically wrong. In response to U.S. Republican candidate Mitt Romney's remarks about the "47%" of Americans who will "always" vote Democrat because they are dependent on the welfare state, Caplan writes,

Wrong, wrong, wrong. The 47% won't vote for Obama "no matter what." Almost half of voters who earn less than the median income vote Republican in the typical election. A person doesn't support the nanny state because he wants government to take care of him; a person supports the nanny state because he wants government to take care of us.

Caplan says that voters consistently demonstrate preferences that are not clearly related to self-interest, and they are motivated primarily by what they believe is best for the country.

=== Rational irrationality ===
Related to the public choice concept of rational ignorance, Caplan proposes the concept of "rational irrationality" as an explanation for why the average voter holds views that are persistently and systematically contradictory to the consensus view of expert economists. His thesis is that indulging innate cognitive biases (of which he identifies four as being major contributors to bad economic policy positions) is psychologically gratifying, while overcoming natural prejudices through training, education, and skepticism, is psychologically costly. Therefore, when the personal benefit giving in to our biases is greater than the personal cost suffered from acting on them, individuals will tend to rationally indulge in irrational behavior, like voting for protectionist tariffs and other economically damaging but socially popular policies.

These views tend not to be related to the particular voter in any rationally self-interested way, and so voters are genuinely not being subject to any direct economic penalties for choosing irrational policies. The altruistic voter will indulge, without restraint, in make-work bias, anti-foreign bias, pessimistic bias, and anti-market bias, all in the hopes of better his fellow man through the ballot box.

== Criticisms and modifications ==
- A 2008 study of voters in Sweden during the 1990s found significant evidence for self-interested "pocketbook" voting. The authors found that voters can and will respond to direct promises of personal economic benefits, although it appears that citizens respond almost entirely to the prospective promises of politicians but not to the actual implementation of those policies.
- George Mason Law Professor Tun-Jen Chiang criticized the Edlin altruist model as overly simplistic and ultimately naive about voter preferences. Chiang presents an alternative model of altruist voting behavior, centered around voters' selective altruism towards favored racial, cultural, religious, regional, sexual, economic, or social groups (of which they may or may not be a member). He contends that, even if two candidates policies had identical social welfare benefits overall,

It is rational to vote as long as the candidates differ in their effect on the welfare of subsets of the population, and one happens to be particularly concerned with an affected subset. For example, if a candidate proposed to take wealth from the richer half of the population and distribute it to the poorer half, and the redistribution created no overall effects, a voter under the broad altruism model would have no incentive to vote. However, if a voter cared particularly for the welfare of the poor, that voter would have an incentive to vote for the candidate; similarly, a voter that cared particular for the welfare of the rich would have an incentive to vote against the candidate. The result in my model is that both such voters would be rationally motivated to vote.

== See also ==
- Paradox of voting
- Rational choice
- Rational ignorance
- Rational irrationality
- Voting behavior
- Voting system
