= Congleton (surname) =

Congleton is a surname. Notable people with the surname include:

- John Congleton (born 1977), American record producer, engineer, mixer, and writer
- Jerome T. Congleton (1876–1936), American politician
- Roger D. Congleton (born 1951), American economist
