= Constitutional economics =

Research program in economics and constitutionalism

Constitutional economics is a research program in economics and constitutionalism that has been described as explaining the choice "of alternative sets of legal-institutional-constitutional rules that constrain the choices and activities of economic and political agents". This extends beyond the definition of "the economic analysis of constitutional law" and is distinct from explaining the choices of economic and political agents within those rules, a subject of orthodox economics. Instead, constitutional economics takes into account the impacts of political economic decisions as opposed to limiting its analysis to economic relationships as functions of the dynamics of distribution of marketable goods and services.

Constitutional economics was pioneered by the work of James M. Buchanan. He argued that "The political economist who seeks to offer normative advice, must, of necessity, concentrate on the process or structure within which political decisions are observed to be made. Existing constitutions, or structures or rules, are the subject of critical scrutiny."

Constitutional economics has been characterized as a practical approach to apply the tools of economics to constitutional matters. For example, a major concern of every nation is the proper allocation of available national economic and financial resources. The legal solution to this problem falls within the scope of constitutional economics. Another example is to study the "compatibility of effective economic decisions with the existing constitutional framework and the limitations or the favorable conditions created by that framework".

== Origins ==
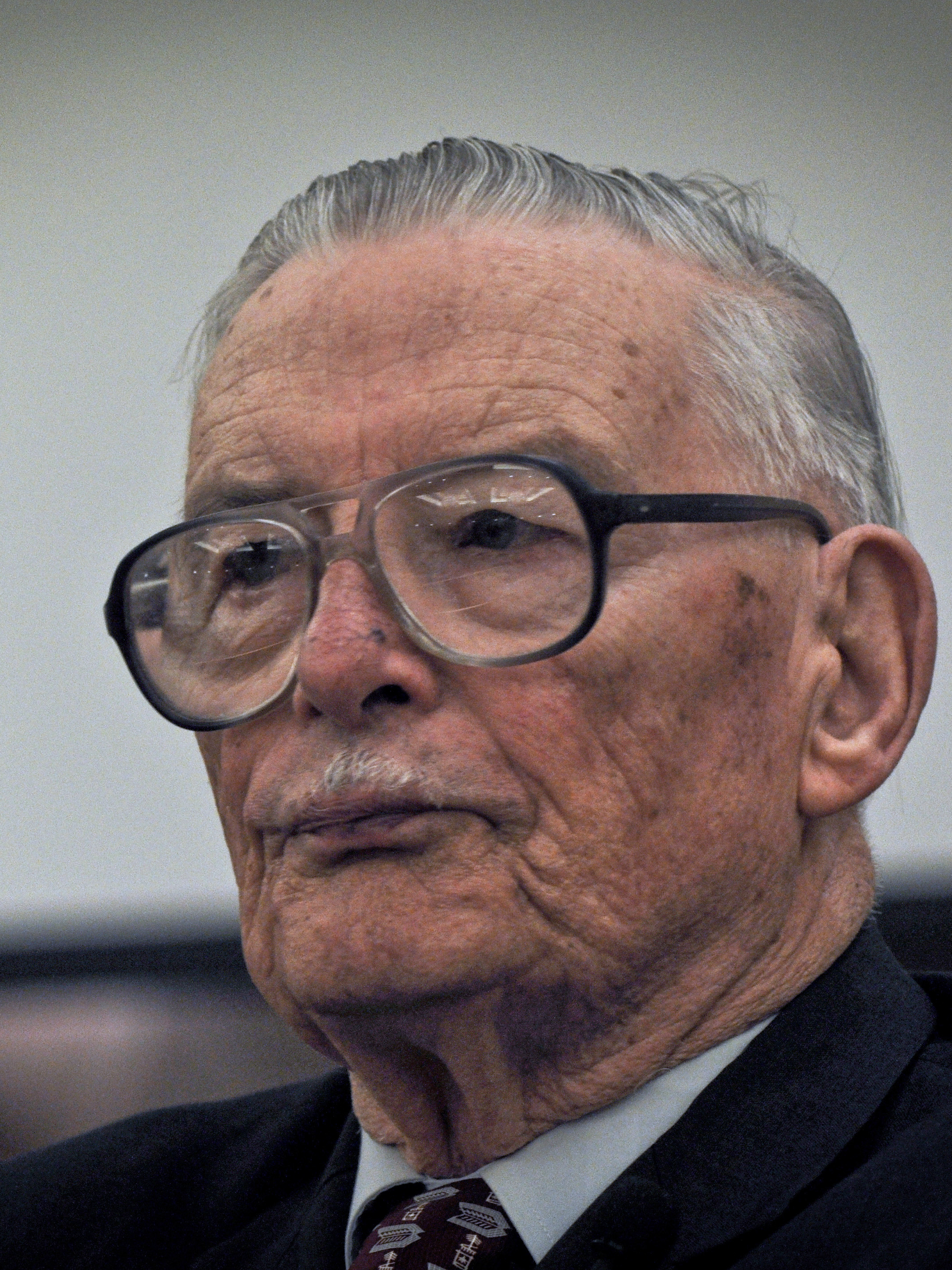
Constitutional economics was popularized by James M. Buchanan, for which he received the 1986 Nobel Memorial Prize in Economic Sciences (pictured here in September 2010).

The term "constitutional economics" was coined in 1982 by the U.S. economist Richard McKenzie to designate the main topic of discussion at a conference held in Washington D.C. Later, McKenzie's neologism was adopted by another American economist, James Buchanan, as a name for a new academic sub-discipline. It was Buchanan's work on this sub-discipline that brought him the Nobel Memorial Prize in Economic Sciences for his "development of the contractual and constitutional bases for the theory of economic and political decision-making" in 1986.

Constitutional economics draws substantial inspiration from the reformist attitude which is characteristic of Adam Smith's vision, and that Buchanan's concept can be considered the modern-day counterpart to what Smith called "the science of legislation."

== Positive constitutional economics ==
Within positive constitutional economics, the tools or methods are unique from normal economic tools because of the cross-disciplinary nature of the program. The main tool of positive constitutional economics is "comparative institutional analysis", with four main elements:

1. The first element examines how certain constitutional rules arose and what factors caused the rules to be developed as a result of aggregated individual inputs.
2. The second element looks at how rules are distinguishable between individual and collective factors, though Voigt acknowledges this research method is rarely used.
3. The third element is the possibilities of further constitutional (or rules) change. Any proposed change to constitutional constraints, or rules of constraints, are subject to economic scrutiny for their effects on efficiency and equity.
4. The fourth element of positive constitutional economics examines the economic effects of developed or modified change to rules.

== Normative constitutional economics ==
Normative constitutional economics focuses on legitimizing the state and its actions as the best means of maximum efficiency and utility, judging conditions or rules that are efficient, and discerning and studying the political systems to maximize efficiency, where the outcome of collective choices are considered "fair", "just", or "efficient".

Both Buchanan and Stefan Voigt argue the foundational assumption of normative constitutional economics is that no single individual's goals or values can supersede the value of another's. Therefore, a universal, absolute social norm or goal is impossible. Buchanan viewed politics as a form of exchange, such as when individuals agree to exchange goods. He believed that if people are acting rationally in their own perceived self-interest, and if the decision is voluntary and informed, any such agreement is "efficient" and therefore normatively ought to occur.

Methodological individualism leads Buchanan to the normative claim that a political theory very similar to that of John Rawls in his seminal 1971 work, A Theory of Justice, would best realize individuals' unique goals. Complete with a veil of ignorance and a priori decisions of social goals, Buchanan says political economy does not have a social engineer or moral purpose but only assists individuals in their search for rules that best serve their individual purposes. For Buchanan, the "good" society is one that furthers the interests of individuals, not some independent moral or teleological end.

=== James Buchanan's views on the ethics of constitutional citizenship ===
According to Buchanan, political efficiency, like market efficiency, occurs when all individuals in the community agree to the political structures. Buchanan's argument is similar to a social contract view of government, where individuals agree to place constraints on themselves in exchange for anticipated benefits, Buchanan argued that just as a market transaction occurs through voluntary, mutually beneficial exchange, so with political "exchanges" of rights and authority.

Buchanan believed that the ethic of constitutionalism is a key for constitutional order and "may be called the idealized Kantian world" where the individual "who is making the ordering, along with substantially all of his fellows, adopts the moral law as a general rule for behaviour"

Buchanan introduced the cross-disciplinary concepts of "constitutional citizenship" and "constitutional anarchy". According to Buchanan, "constitutional anarchy" is a modern policy that may be best described as actions undertaken without understanding or taking into account the rules that define the constitutional order. This policy is justified by references to strategic tasks formulated on the basis of competing interests regardless of their subsequent impact on political structure. At the same time Buchanan introduces the concept of "constitutional citizenship", which he designates as compliance of citizens with their constitutional rights and obligations that should be considered as a constituent part of the constitutional policy.

Buchanan wrote that "the ethics of constitutional citizenship is not directly comparable to ethical behavior in interaction with other persons within the constraints imposed by the rules of an existing regime. An individual may be fully responsible, in the standard ethical sense, and yet fail to meet the ethical requirement of constitutional citizenship." Buchanan considered the term "constitutionality" in the broad sense and applied it to families, firms and public institutions, but, first of all, to the state.

Crucial to understanding Buchanan's system of thought is the distinction he made between politics and policy. According to Buchanan, politics is about the rules of the game, where policy is focused on strategies that players adopt within a given set of rules. "Questions about what are good rules of the game are in the domain of social philosophy, whereas questions about the strategies that players will adopt given those rules is the domain of economics, and it is the play between the rules (social philosophy) and the strategies (economics) that constitutes what Buchanan refers to as constitutional political economy".

=== Hayek ===
Buchanan is not the only contributor to normative constitutional economics. Economist Friedrich Hayek also wrote extensively on the topic of constitutional economics, even if he did not name constitutional economics specifically. Hayek defends a representative constitutional democracy as the best structure of government. Hayek's main project was the vindication of freedom and establishing criteria for a regime of freedom.

Hayek was worried by the kind of state that Buchanan/Rawls deemed normative. Hayek thought it necessary for a return to the traditional views of government, human nature, political philosophy, and economics. He believed the Buchanan/Rawls state had the almost inevitable propensity to totalitarianism as the state seeks to maximize individual utility.

== Economic analysis of the US Constitution ==
The generally accepted birth of constitutional economic analysis of US Constitution was Charles Austin Beard's landmark 1913 book An Economic Interpretation of the Constitution of the United States. While most scholars today reject Beard's overall thesis, he initiated a new method of economic and political thought that would evolve into contemporary constitutional economics analysis. Beard's main thesis was that the U.S. Constitution "was essentially an economic document based upon the concept that the fundamental private rights of property are anterior to government and morally beyond the reach of popular majorities."

Writing in 1987 for the Yale Law School, Jonathan Macey synthesizes the history of constitutional economic analysis applied to the US Constitution. Macey offers a different analysis of the US Constitution and responds critically to Beard's view of the Constitution.

As Macey understood Beard a famous and crucial part of the Constitution, separation of powers, was actually a means of allowing hegemony of resources in the hands of the rich few. Macey could not disagree more; he argues that the Constitution and separation of powers were created to hinder aggregate political and economic power. He points to Federalist No. 10, James Madison's argument of the necessity of factions due to what he saw as truths of human nature.

=== Separation of powers ===
Macey demonstrates how constitutional economics can be applied to constitutions. Rather than looking at the political or philosophic intentions of the founders, Macey viewed the constitution through economic eyes, considering the incentives, choices, allocations, and other economics factors within the political rules of a constitution. Traditionally, the creation of factions has been interpreted as a political move to separate power and prevent hegemony of the state. Macey agrees but adds a caveat. He maintains a real economic incentive to factions existed which compelled the Founders to separate government.

Macey argued that if government is not separated into distinct powers, the possibility of extensive rent-seeking threatens the efficiency of the government due to self-interested groups or individuals lobbying to political powers for their goals. In Macey's interpretation of Madison, the separation of powers channels lobbyists into the competitive, more efficient market by raising transaction costs so much that private market means are less expensive than appealing to the various separate powers of government. Macey then quantifies legislation on a standard supply-demand curve, where the demand is the interest groups' desire for laws and the supply is the legislation's provision. He argues that separation of powers shifts the supply curve left, raising the price and decreasing the quantity of legislation.

== Legal approach ==
Judge Richard Posner emphasized the importance of a constitution for economic development. He examines the interrelationship between a constitution and the economic growth. Posner approaches constitutional analysis mainly from the perspective of judges, who constitute a critical force for interpretation and implementation of a constitution, thus—de facto in common law countries—creating the body of constitutional law. He emphasizes the importance of constitutional provisions "in setting broader outer bounds to the exercise of judicial discretion". Thus, a judge, when trying a case, is guided firstly by the spirit and letter of the constitution. The role of economics in this process is to help "identify the consequences of alternative interpretations" of the constitution.

He then explains that "economics may provide insight into questions that bear on the proper legal interpretation". In the end, as Posner emphasizes, "the limits of an economic approach to deciding constitutional cases [are] set by the Constitution". In addition, he argues that "effective protection of basic economic rights promotes economic growth".

Concurrently with the rise of academic research in the field of constitutional economics in the US in the 1980s, the Supreme Court of India for almost a decade had been encouraging public interest litigation on behalf of the poor and oppressed by using a very broad interpretation of several articles of the Indian Constitution. The former Chief Justice of Indonesian Constitutional Court, Jimly Asshiddiqie, also published his book "Konstitusi Ekonomi" (2010) in promoting the idea of Economic Constitution. This is a vivid example of a de facto practical application of the methodology of constitutional economics.

The President of the Constitutional Court of the Russian Federation, Valery Zorkin, made a special reference to the educational role of constitutional economics: "In Russia, the addition of such new academic disciplines as constitutional economics to the curricula of university law and economics departments becomes critically important."

== Russian school ==
The Russian school of constitutional economics was created in the early twenty-first century with the idea that constitutional economics allows for a combined economic and constitutional analysis in the legislative (especially budgetary) process, thus helping to overcome arbitrariness in the economic and financial decision-making. For instance, when military expenses (and the like) dwarf the budget spending on education and culture. Constitutional economics studies such issues as the proper national wealth distribution. This also includes the government spending on the judiciary, which in many transitional and developing countries is completely controlled by the executive.

The latter undermines the principle of checks and balances, instrumental in the separation of powers, as this creates a critical financial dependence of the judiciary. It is important to distinguish between the two methods of corruption of the judiciary: the state corruption (through budget planning and various privileges being the most dangerous), and the private corruption. The former makes it almost impossible for any business to facilitate the optimal growth and development of national market economy. In the English language, the word "constitution" possesses a whole number of meanings, encompassing not only national constitutions as such but also charters of corporations, unwritten rules of various clubs, informal groups, etc.

The Russian model of constitutional economics, originally intended for transitional and developing countries, focuses entirely on the concept of constitution of a state. This model of the constitutional economics is based on the understanding that it is necessary to narrow the gap between practical enforcement of the economic, social, and political rights granted by the constitution and the annual (or midterm) economic policy, budget legislation and administrative policies conducted by the government. In 2006, the Russian Academy of Sciences officially recognized constitutional economics as a separate academic sub-discipline.

== Criticism ==
Walter Block and Thomas DiLorenzo criticize the possibility of constitutional economics as a science. They maintain that politics cannot be equated with the market and therefore, as a study, it cannot exist. They maintain that unlike the market, consent is not the foundation of politics, and that politics is driven by violent, historically bellicose, coercion. Therefore, they believe that the constitutional economic method only clouds the discussion of public choice and political economy. Buchanan, Voigt, Macey, and even Beard all implicitly assume that politics is the exchange of political "goods", a strong social contract view.

But for Block and DiLorenzo, politics is one powerful group coercing free rides from a weaker group. From the Roman Empire to the present, they trace how the state always comes from conquest and exploitation, never consent. The Calculus of Consent, a foundational text for constitutional economics, bears much of their attack. If they are correct that no state has been or can be voluntary and that voluntary government is inherently contradictory, constitutional economics as a discipline cannot exist.

William Campbell explains the weakness of constitutional economics in its assumption that the goal of a regime must be efficiency, individual liberty, and libertarian rights, not morality or super-individual good.

== See also ==
- Constitutionalism
- Constitutional law
- Constitutional Political Economy
- Democracy and economic growth
- Institutional economics
- Independence of the judiciary
- James M. Buchanan
- Justification for the state
- Law and economics
- New institutional economics
- New political economy
- Rule of law
- Welfare state

== Sources ==
- Asshiddiqie, Jimly, 2010. Economic Constitution, Kompas, Jakarta, 2010.
- Peter Barenboim, Constitutional Economics and the Bank of Russia, in Fordham Journal of Corporate and Financial Law, 7(1), 2001, p. 160
- Ezhegodnik konstitutsionnoy ekonomiki 2019 / 2019 Yearbook of Constitutional Economics / (A Collection of Articles). Edited by Alexei Liverovsky and Gadis Gadjiev. Compiled by Alexei Liverovsky and Pyotr Barenboim. — Moscow, LOOM Publishers, 2019 (the book is in Russian). ISBN 978-5-906072-41-2.
- Ezhegodnik konstitutsionnoy ekonomiki 2018 / 2018 Yearbook of Constitutional Economics / (A Collection of Articles). Edited by Suren Avakian, Pyotr Barenboim, and Valentina Komarova. Compiled by Pyotr Barenboim. — Moscow, LOOM Publishers, 2018 (the book is in Russian). ISBN 978-5-906072-37-5.
- McKenzie, Richard, ed., 1984. Constitutional Economics, Lexington, Mass.
- Backhaus, Jürgen G., ed. The Elgar Companion to Law and Economics:

Farina, Francesco, 2005. "Constitutional Economics I," pp. 184–222.
Van den Hauwe, Ludwig, 2005. "Constitutional Economics II," pp. 223–38.

- James A. Dorn, 2004. "Creating a Constitutional Order of Freedom in Emerging Market Economies," Economic Affairs, 24(3), pp. 58–63. Abstract.
- Brennan, Geoffrey and James M. Buchanan, 1985. The Reason of Rules: Constitutional Political Economy , Chicago. In The Collected Works of James M. Buchanan, Vol. 10, chapter links, Library of Economics and Liberty.
- _____, 1986. "The Constitution of Economic Policy," Nobel Prize lecture, reprinted in American Economic Review, 77(3), p p. 243–50.
- _____, 1987. "constitutional economics," The New Palgrave Dictionary of Economics, v. 1, pp. 585–88.
- _____, 1990a. "The Domain of Constitutional Economics," Constitutional Political Economy, 1(1), pp. 1–18. Also as at 1990b & .
- _____, 1990b. The Economics and the Ethics of Constitutional Order, University of Michigan Press. Description & chapter links.
- _____ and Gordon Tullock, 1962. The Calculus of Consent. University of Michigan Press. Chapter-preview links.
- Constitutional Political Economy. Description and abstract links.
- Frey, Bruno S., 1997, "A Constitution for Knaves Crowds out Civic Virtues," Economic Journal, 107(443), p p. 1043–53.
- Hayek, Friedrich A., [1960] 2011. The Constitution of Liberty: The Definitive Edition, v. 17, The Collected Works of F A. Hayek, Chicago. Description and preview.
- _____. Law, Legislation and Liberty, Chicago:

1973. v. 1. Rules and Order. Description and chapter-preview links.
1976. v. 2. The Mirage of Social Justice. Description and chapter-preview links.
1979. v. 3. The Political Order of a Free People. Description and chapter-preview links.

- Mueller, Dennis C., 2008. "constitutions, economic approach to,' The New Palgrave Dictionary of Economics, 2nd Edition. Abstract.
- Persson, Torsten, and Guido Tabellini, 2005. The Economic Effects of Constitutions. Description and chapter links.
- Sutter, Daniel, 1995. "Constitutional Politics within the Interest-Group Model," Constitutional Political Economy, 6(2), p p. 127–37.
- "Economics and the Rule of Law" The Economist (2008-03-13).
- Voigt, Stefan, 1997. "Positive Constitutional Economics: A Survey," Public Choice, 90(1-4), p p. 11–53.
- Hernando de Soto, "Law connects", International Bar News, December 2008
