= Paradox of voting =

Paradox of voting may refer to:

- Downs' paradox of voting - the claim that the costs of voting normally exceeds the expected benefits, hence it is not rational to go voting;
- Condorcet paradox - a situation where the majority prefers A to B, B to C, and C to A; hence, no rational choice is possible.
