= Congleton, North Carolina =

Unincorporated community in North Carolina, US

Coordinates: 35°45′09″N 77°13′52″W

Congleton is an unincorporated community in Pitt County, in the U.S. state of North Carolina.

== History ==
James R. Congleton was a local postmaster.
