= Congleton, Kentucky =

Congleton, Kentucky may refer to:

- Congleton, Lee County, Kentucky, a settlement in the United States
- Congleton, McLean County, Kentucky, a settlement in the United States
