= Roger D. Congleton =

American economist

Roger Douglas Congleton (born November 13, 1951) is an American economist. He serves as the BB&T Professor of Economics at West Virginia University and is the co-editor-in-chief of the journal Constitutional Political Economy.

== Career ==
Congleton received his B.S., M.S., and Ph.D. from Virginia Polytechnic Institute and State University. He previously taught at George Mason University, where he concurrently worked as a researcher at the Center for Study of Public Choice. Congleton has also held appointments at the University of Bayreuth and was a Fulbright Scholar in Odense.
