= Stefan Voigt =

Stefan Voigt (born 19 August 1962) is a German economist and professor of law and economics. He is Professor of Law and Economics at the University of Hamburg and has been Director of its Institute of Law and Economics since 2009.

Voigt's research focuses on institutional economics, constitutional economics, the economics of the judiciary and the rule of law, and the empirical study of constitutional compliance. More recently, he has also investigated the relationship between culture, values, social norms and institutional development.

== Academic career ==
Voigt studied economics at the University of Freiburg. He subsequently received his doctorate and habilitation in economics. From 1994 to 2000 he was affiliated with the Max Planck Institute for Research into Economic Systems in Jena.

He held professorships at Ruhr University Bochum, the University of Kassel, and Philipps University Marburg. From 2006 to 2009 he was Professor of Institutional Economics and International Economic Relations at the University of Marburg and Director of the Marburg Center for Institutional Economics (MACIE).

In the academic year 1999–2000, Voigt was a Fellow at the Wissenschaftskolleg zu Berlin, where his research project concerned the possible institutional consequences of the global division of labour.

Since October 2009, Voigt has been Professor of Law and Economics at the University of Hamburg and Director of its Institute of Law and Economics.

== Research ==
=== Constitutional economics ===
A major part of Voigt's early research concerns the positive economic analysis of constitutions and constitutional change. In his book Explaining Constitutional Change: A Positive Economics Approach (1999), he developed an economic approach to explaining why constitutions emerge and change. He conceptualizes constitutional change as the outcome of a bargaining process in which changes in the relative bargaining power of political actors can lead to changes in constitutional rules.

Voigt has also studied the delegation of political powers, separation of powers, constitutional choice and the economic consequences of constitutional rules. His work on constitutional change has been discussed in the comparative constitutional literature as an example of an economic theory of constitutional change.

He is also the author of Institutional Economics: An Introduction, published by Cambridge University Press in 2019.

=== Judicial independence ===
Another major area of Voigt's research concerns the economics of the judiciary. Together with Lars P. Feld, he developed cross-country indicators distinguishing between the formal, or de jure, independence of courts and their actual, or de facto, independence.

Their 2003 study, "Economic Growth and Judicial Independence: Cross-Country Evidence Using a New Set of Indicators", examined the relationship between judicial independence and economic growth using cross-country data.

The research was subsequently extended with Jerg Gutmann and Feld. The 2015 study updated the indicators and re-examined the relationship between judicial independence and economic growth.

=== Rule of law and constitutional compliance ===
In later research, Voigt increasingly focused on the distinction between formal institutional rules and their actual implementation. His work on the rule of law includes the development of measures that seek to capture the extent to which legal rules are actually implemented rather than merely formally established.

Together with Jerg Gutmann, he developed an empirical approach to measuring the rule of law and its historical determinants. Their article "The Rule of Law: Measurement and Deep Roots" was published in the European Journal of Political Economy in 2018.

Voigt subsequently became involved in the systematic empirical study of constitutional compliance: the extent to which governments actually observe the restrictions imposed on them by their constitutions. Together with Jerg Gutmann and Katarzyna Metelska-Szaniawska, he developed the Comparative Constitutional Compliance Database, which records constitutional compliance across 175 countries from 1900 to 2020.

The research program has examined a range of factors that may influence constitutional compliance, including characteristics of political leaders, political institutions, federalism, and constitutional change. Subsequent work has also investigated whether replacing or amending constitutions affects the extent to which governments comply with constitutional constraints.

=== States of emergency ===
Together with Christian Bjørnskov, Voigt has studied the economic and institutional determinants of states of emergency. Their book State of Emergency: An Economic Analysis, published by Cambridge University Press in 2024, examines the constitutional design, determinants and use of emergency powers, including their use during the COVID-19 pandemic.

=== Culture, values and social norms ===
A more recent strand of Voigt's research examines the relationship between cultural characteristics, values, social norms and institutional development.

One project is the Historical Values Survey (HistoVaS), developed by Voigt together with Mahdi Khesali and Nadia von Jacobi. The project uses more than 27,000 folk narratives from 172 present-day countries to construct measures of historically prevalent values and norms. The variables cover, among other things, cooperation, altruism, work ethic, entrepreneurship, tolerance, discrimination and attitudes towards authority.

The project is intended to provide historical measures of values for periods for which comparable international survey data do not exist. The researchers have used the resulting data to investigate whether historically prevalent values and norms are associated with differences in contemporary economic development.

== Selected publications ==
=== Books ===
Explaining Constitutional Change: A Positive Economics Approach. Edward Elgar, Cheltenham, 1999. Institutionenökonomik. Fink/UTB, Munich, 2002; 2nd ed. 2009. Institutional Economics: An Introduction. Cambridge University Press, Cambridge, 2019. State of Emergency: An Economic Analysis. With Christian Bjørnskov. Cambridge University Press, Cambridge, 2024.

=== Selected articles ===
Lars P. Feld and Stefan Voigt, "Economic Growth and Judicial Independence: Cross-Country Evidence Using a New Set of Indicators". European Journal of Political Economy 19 (2003), 497–527. Jerg Gutmann and Stefan Voigt, "The Rule of Law: Measurement and Deep Roots". European Journal of Political Economy 54 (2018), 68–82. Jerg Gutmann, Katarzyna Metelska-Szaniawska and Stefan Voigt, "The Comparative Constitutional Compliance Database". The Review of International Organizations 19 (2024), 95–115.

== See also ==
- Constitutional economics
- Institutional economics
- Law and economics
- Rule of law
