= Loren Lomasky =

American philosopher

- Occupation: Philosopher

Loren E. Lomasky is an American philosopher, currently the Cory Professor of Political Philosophy, Policy and Law at the University of Virginia.

== Biography ==
Lomasky earned his PhD from the University of Connecticut, and has previously taught at Bowling Green State University in Ohio, the University of Minnesota in Duluth, and the Australian National University in Canberra. He has also been a contributing editor to Reason magazine.

Lomasky has written principally on ethics and political philosophy. His book Persons, Rights, and the Moral Community established his reputation as a leading advocate of a rights-based approach to moral and social issues. Besides these, his teaching interests include the philosophy of religion, medieval philosophy, and other periods in the history of philosophy.

Lomasky has been the recipient of many awards including the 1991 Matchette Prize for his Persons, Rights, and the Moral Community. Lomasky has held research appointments sponsored by the NEH, the Center for the Study of Public Choice, the Australian National University and Bowling Green's Social Philosophy and Policy Center.

== On meat eating ==
Lomasky is a noted opponent of animal rights. He authored the paper "Is it wrong to eat animals?", in 2013 which defends meat eating and criticizes the arguments of moral vegetarianism. Lomasky argues that the pleasures of consuming meat "afford human beings goods comparable qualitatively and quantitatively to those held forth by the arts. Lives of many people would be significantly impaired were they to forgo carnivorous consumption."

== Selected publications ==
- "When Hard Heads Collide: A Philosopher Encounters Public Choice," The American Journal of Economics and Sociology, 63 (2004).
- "Liberty and Welfare Goods: Reflection on Clashing Liberalisms," Journal of Ethics 4 (2000).
- "Aid Without Egalitarianism: Assisting Indigent Defendants," in William C. Heffernan & John Kleinig (eds.), From Social Justice to Criminal Justice, Oxford: Oxford University Press, 2000, ISBN 0-19-512985-7.
- Democracy and Decision: The Pure Theory of Electoral Preference, Cambridge: Cambridge University Press, 1993, ISBN 0-521-35043-3 (with Geoffrey Brennan).
- Politics and Process: New Essays in Democratic Thought, Cambridge: Cambridge University Press 1989, ISBN 0-521-35043-3 (co-editor, with Geoffrey Brennan).
- Persons, Rights, and the Moral Community, Oxford: Oxford University Press, 1987, ISBN 0-19-504209-3.

== See also ==
- American philosophy
- Libertarian views of rights
- List of American philosophers
