= Philip Pettit =

Irish philosopher and political theorist

Philip Pettit AC
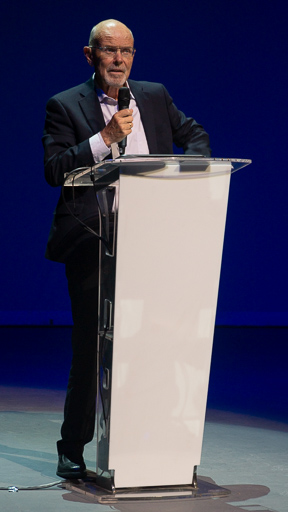
- Born: Philip Noel Pettit; 1945 (age 80–81); Ballygar, Ireland

Education
- Education: Maynooth College; Queen's University Belfast

Philosophical work
- Era: Contemporary philosophy
- Region: Western philosophy
- School: Civic republicanism
- Institutions: Australian National University; Princeton University
- Main interests: Political philosophy, social ontology, philosophy of mind, ethics

Philip Noel Pettit AC (born 1945) is an Irish philosopher and political theorist. He is the Laurance Rockefeller University Professor of Human Values at Princeton University and also Distinguished University Professor of Philosophy at the Australian National University.

== Education and career ==
Pettit was educated at Garbally College, the National University of Ireland, Maynooth (BA, LPh, MA) and Queen's University Belfast (PhD).

He has been a lecturer at University College Dublin, a research fellow at Trinity Hall, Cambridge, and professor at the University of Bradford. He was for many years professorial fellow in social and political theory at the Research School of Social Sciences, Australian National University before becoming a visiting professor of philosophy at Columbia University for five years, then moving to Princeton.

He is the recipient of numerous honours, including an honorary doctorate from the National University of Ireland. He was keynote speaker at Graduate Conference, University of Toronto.

He was elected a fellow of the American Academy of Arts and Sciences in 2009, and a Corresponding Fellow of the British Academy in 2013. He has also been a Guggenheim Fellow.

== Philosophical work ==
Pettit defends a version of civic republicanism in political philosophy. His book Republicanism: A Theory of Freedom and Government provided the underlying justification for political reforms in Spain under José Luis Rodríguez Zapatero. Pettit detailed his relationship with Zapatero in his A Political Philosophy in Public Life: Civic Republicanism in Zapatero's Spain, co-authored with José Luis Martí.

Pettit holds that the lessons learned when thinking about problems in one area of philosophy often constitute ready-made solutions to problems faced in completely different areas. Views he defends in philosophy of mind give rise to the solutions he offers to problems in metaphysics about the nature of free will, and to problems in the philosophy of the social sciences, and these in turn give rise to the solutions he provides to problems in moral philosophy and political philosophy. His corpus as a whole was the subject of a series of critical essays published in Common Minds: Themes from the Philosophy of Philip Pettit (Oxford University Press, 2007).

== Affiliations and honours ==
- Fellow of the Academy of the Social Sciences in Australia (1987)
- Corresponding Fellow of the Australian Academy of the Humanities (1988)
- Fellow of the American Academy of Arts and Sciences (2009)
- Honorary member of the Royal Irish Academy (2010)
- Corresponding Fellow of the British Academy (2013)
- Member of the scientific committee of the Fundacion IDEAS
- Companion of the Order of Australia (AC) in the 2017 Queen's Birthday Honours (Australia)
- Corresponding Fellow of the French Académie des Sciences morales et politiques (2019)

== Selected bibliography ==
=== Books ===
- The Concept of Structuralism: a Critical Analysis (1975)
- Judging justice: an introduction to contemporary political philosophy (1980)
- Rawls: 'A Theory of Justice' and its critics (1990) with Chandran Kukathas
- The Common Mind; an essay on psychology, society and politics (1993)
- Not Just Deserts. A Republican Theory of Criminal Justice (ISBN 978-0-19-824056-3) with John Braithwaite
- Republicanism: a theory of freedom and government (1997)
- Three Methods of Ethics: a debate (1997) with Marcia Baron and Michael Slote
- A Theory of Freedom: from psychology to the politics of agency (2001)
- Rules, Reasons and Norms: selected essays (2002)
- The Economy of Esteem: an essay on civil and political society (2004) with Geoffrey Brennan
- Mind, Morality, and Explanation: Selected Collaborations (with Frank Jackson and Michael Smith) (Oxford University Press, 2004)
- Made with Words: Hobbes on Language, Mind, and Politics (2007)
- "Joining the Dots" in Common Minds: Themes from the Philosophy of Philip Pettit (2007) edited by Geoffrey Brennan, Robert E. Goodin, Frank Jackson and Michael Smith
- A Political Philosophy in Public Life: Civic Republicanism in Zapatero's Spain (2010) with José Luis Martí
- Group Agency: The Possibility, Design, and Status of Corporate Agents. (2011) with Christian List
- On The People's Terms: A Republican Theory and Model of Democracy. (2012)
- Just Freedom: A Moral Compass for a Complex World. (2015)
- The Robust Demands of the Good: Ethics with Attachment, Virtue, and Respect. (2015)
- The State (2023)

=== Chapters in books ===
- Pettit, Philip (2004), "The common good", in Dowding, Keith; Pateman, Carole; Goodin, Robert E. (eds.), Justice and democracy: essays for Brian Barry, Cambridge New York: Cambridge University Press, pp. 25–39, ISBN 9780521836951.
- Pettit, Philip (2009), "Freedom in the spirit of Sen", in Morris, Christopher (ed.), Amartya Sen, Cambridge New York: Cambridge University Press, pp. 91–114, ISBN 9780521618069
