= Political efficacy =

Citizens' trust in their ability to influence politics

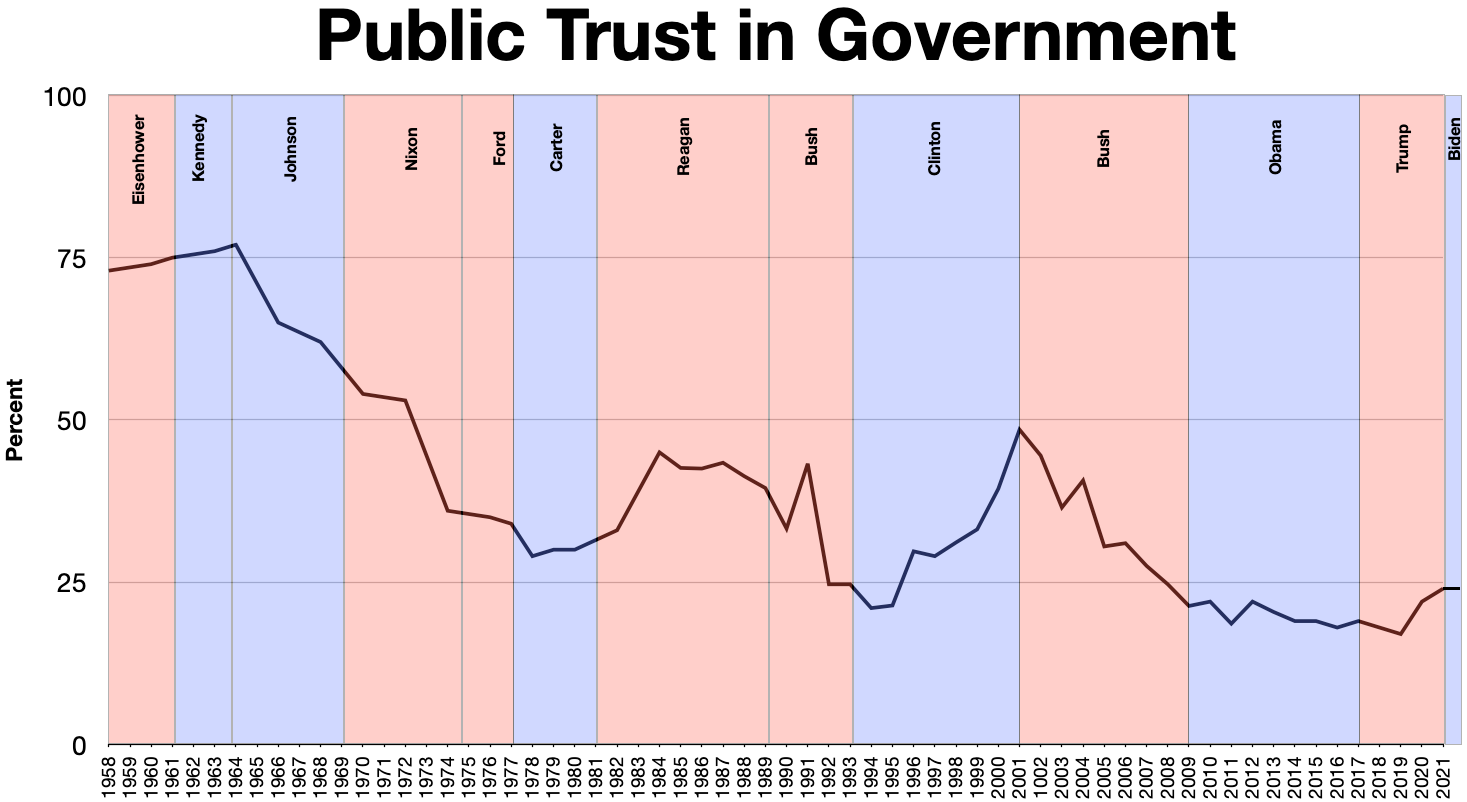
Graph of public trust in government in the United States of America

In political science, political efficacy is the citizens' trust in their ability to change the government and belief that they can understand and influence political affairs. It is commonly measured by surveys and is used as an indicator for the broader health of civil society.

It is closely related to political responsiveness, the degree to which politicians and policymakers actually do respond to voters' beliefs and preferences.

== Concept ==
It was introduced by Angus Campbell, Gerald Gurin, and W. E. Miller during an analyses of behavior and attitude of the voters in the 1952 United States presidential election and defined as the "feeling that individual action does have, or can have, an impact upon the political process".

There are two types of political efficacy:

- internal efficacy: the belief that one can understand politics and therefore participate in politics
- external efficacy: that the government will respond to one's demands

Political efficacy is viewed as a "pre-condition for political engagement and is considered as a vital social characteristic within democratic societies."

Proportional representation shows higher political efficacy compared to plurality and majoritarian systems. Wasted votes can reduce political efficacy. Low political efficacy can lead to populism.

== Ways of expression ==
There are multiple ways in which citizens' political efficacy can be expressed: through the media, by having the right to protest, by being able to create petitions, and by having free and fair elections. The feeling that a citizen is powerless in their own country may lead to political cynicism or outright violence, which are side effects of having low political efficacy in society. Citizens' political efficacy can also be expressed online through social media outlets as "media use – and news consumption in particular – enhances efficacy, public affairs knowledge, and civic engagement".

Feelings of efficacy are highly correlated with participation in social and political life; however, studies have not shown any relationship between public confidence in government or political leaders and voting. Political efficacy was found to polarize policy preferences. People with relatively high efficacy were found to express policy preferences that are more in line with their ideological orientation and more extreme; and people with low efficacy tend to express more moderate policy preferences. These results were in both experimental and observational studies. Efficacy usually increases with age.

While efficacy often drives participation, the relationship can be complex depending on electoral outcomes. A 2026 longitudinal study of the 2024 UK General Election found that while elections typically restore political trust, this restorative effect is significantly dampened for voters who supported losing parties and had engaged in high levels of collective action (such as protesting). For these individuals, the dissonance between their active engagement and the unfavorable political outcome may reinforce a belief that the system is unresponsive (low external efficacy).

== See also ==
- Political apathy
- Political accountability
- Political corruption
