= Geoffrey Brennan =

Australian philosopher (1944–2022)

Geoffrey Brennan (September 15, 1944 – July 29, 2022) was an Australian philosopher. He was professor of philosophy at the University of North Carolina at Chapel Hill, professor of political science at Duke University, and faculty member in the Research School of Social Sciences (RSSS) at the Australian National University. He was the Director of the Research School from 1991–1996.

Trained as an economist, Brennan collaborated extensively with Nobel Prize winner James M. Buchanan and became the first non-American president of the Public Choice Society in 2002.

Brennan published widely on rational actor theory, philosophy, and economics, and sat on the editorial board of the academic journal Representation. He held academic positions in several related departments at Australia National University and Virginia Tech. With Loren Lomasky he won the American Philosophical Association's Gregory Kavka Prize in Political Philosophy for the paper "Is There a Duty to Vote?"

He was also awarded an honorary doctorate in Economics (Dr. oec. h. c.) from the University of St. Gallen in 2002, the Distinguished Fellow Award of the Economic Society of Australia in 2013, and the Gutenberg Teaching Award of Johannes Gutenberg University of Mainz (Germany) in 2018. He held multiple fellowships (Fall 2008, September 2009, Fall 2011) at the Swedish Collegium for Advanced Study in Uppsala, Sweden.

Brennan was a golfer, and a semi-professional singer (for some years a national recitalist with the ABC).

In 2022 Brennan died in Canberra of complications from acute leukemia.

== Bibliography ==
- The Power to Tax (1980) (with James M. Buchanan)
- The Reason of Rules (1985) (with James M. Buchanan)
- Democracy and Decision: The Pure Theory of Electoral Preference (Cambridge University Press, 1993) (with Loren Lomasky).
- Politics and Process: New Essays in Democratic Theory (Cambridge University Press 1989) (ed., with Loren Lomasky).
- Democratic Devices and Desires (2000) (with Alan Hamlin)
- The Economy of Esteem (2004) (with Philip Pettit)
- Collected Works of James Buchanan (ed., with Hartmut Kliemt and Robert Tollison)
- Brennan, Geoffrey (2018). "Part II: Questioning Libertarianism Principles; Ch. 13: Liberty: A PPE Approach". In Brennan, Jason; van der Vossen, Bas; Schmidtz, David (eds.). The Routledge Handbook of Libertarianism. London and New York: Taylor & Francis Group. pp. 184–198. ISBN 978-0367870591.
