= Boondoggle =

Project that continues despite its wastefulness

A boondoggle is a project that is considered a waste of both time and money, yet is often continued due to extraneous policy or political motivations.

== Etymology ==
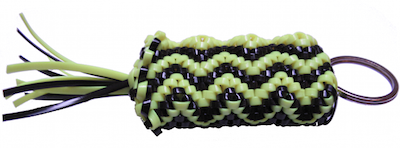
Boondoggle

"Boondoggle" was the name of the newspaper of the Roosevelt Troop of the Boy Scouts, based in Rochester, New York, and it first appeared in print in 1927. From there it passed into general use in scouting in the 1930s. It was attributed to a boy scout from Rochester who coined the term to describe "a new type of uniform decoration". After the presentation of honorific boondoggles at a World Jamboree, the use of the word spread to other troops and branches. An Oakland scout troop presented a "boondoggle" as an award for attendees who spent seven days and nights at Camp Dimond. That boondoggle was described as a "red leather strip which terminates in a red wooden diamond on which is painted the number 1930." The "boondoggle" was described in the Ogden Standard-Examiner in 1930 as a hand-made item crafted from brightly colored leather strips. In 1931, it was similarly described as a "bright lanyard made of leatherstrip".

== Early usage ==
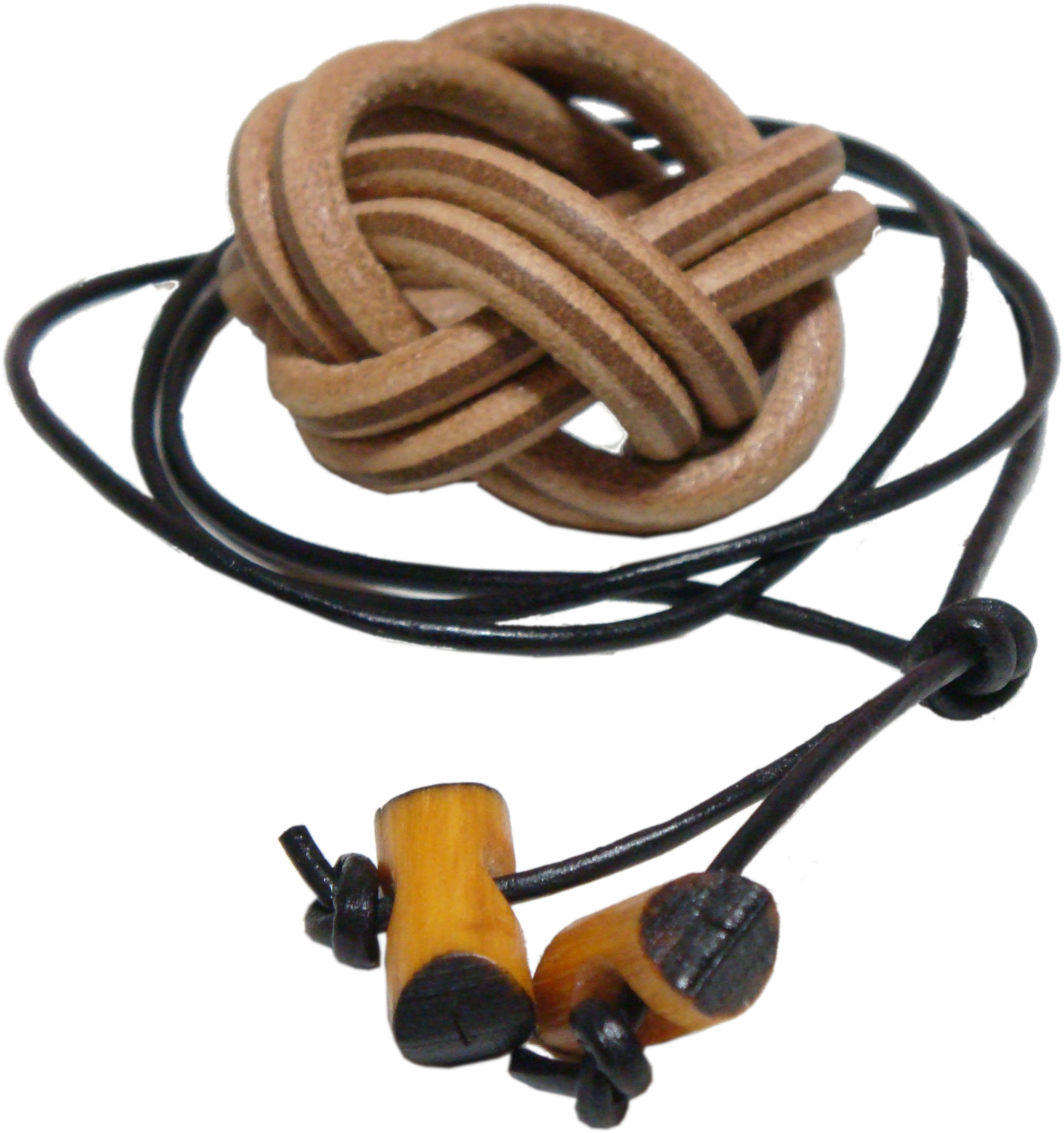
Leather crafts

In 1935, an article in The New York Times reported that more than $3 million had been spent on recreational activities for the jobless as part of the New Deal. Among these activities were crafts classes, where the production of "boon doggles", described in the article as various utilitarian "gadgets" made with scoubidou cloth or leather, were taught. The phrase became popular due to its use by the flamboyant criminal lawyer Lloyd Paul Stryker.

In her 1993 memoir Nothing But the Truth, journalist Marguerite Young wrote of the 1930s:

I thought official figures and events seemed to say the biggest thing was relief—feeding the hungry, made work such as raking leaves which gave the English language a new word, boondoggle.

== Dynamics ==
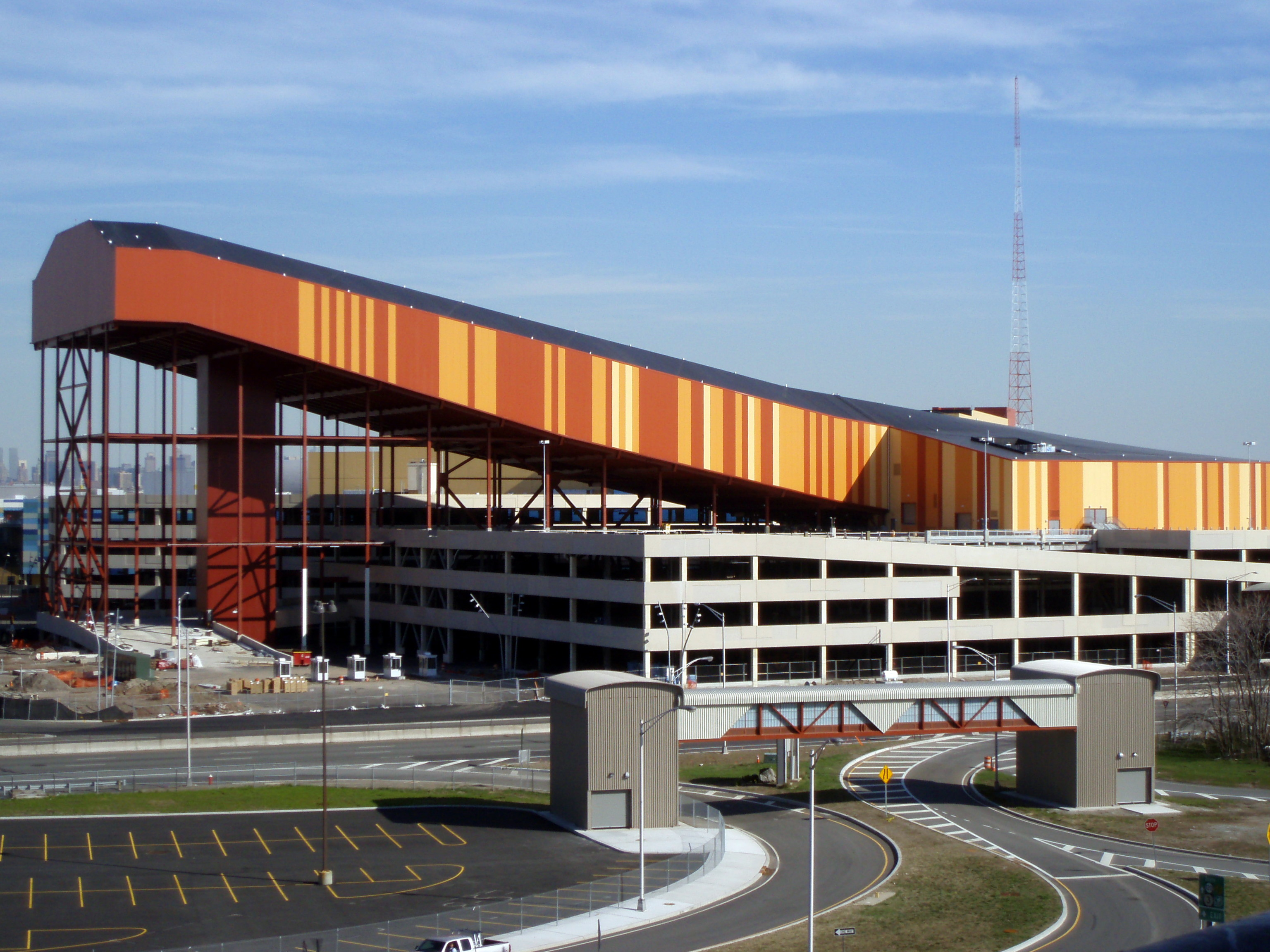
The American Dream Meadowlands has been criticized as a boondoggle.

The term "boondoggle" may also be used to refer to protracted government or corporate projects involving large numbers of people and usually heavy expenditure, where at some point, the key operators, having realized that the project will never work, are still reluctant to bring this to the attention of their superiors. Generally there is an aspect of "going through the motions"—for example, continuing research and development—as long as funds are available to keep paying the researchers' and executives' salaries.

The situation can be allowed to continue for what seems like unreasonably long periods, as senior management are often reluctant to admit that they allowed a failed project to go on for so long. In many cases, the actual device itself may eventually work, but not well enough to ever recoup its development costs.

== Examples ==
=== Public policy ===
Balanced literacy, a theory of teaching reading and writing the English language that arose in the 1990s, was prominent in early literacy curricula across the United States until the 2020s after decades of overall low reading achievement and a persistent racial gap. One publisher of balanced literacy materials, Heinemann made at least $1.6 billion in sales during a ten-year period between 2012 and 2022. Supporters of balanced literacy claim there is no reading crisis because the scores on the National Assessment of Educational Progress (NAEP) were mostly flat for decades, with 37 percent reading below Basic level. However, at least 18 states are considering new laws to remove balanced literacy and instead use methods aligned with cognitive science research about how children learn to read.

=== Public infrastructure ===
The Berlin Brandenburg Airport was built in 14 years rather the originally scheduled five years, and at at a cost of 7 billion euros, almost three times its original budget. One of the more glaring causes of its overruns was a fire safety system intended to vent smoke downward, against its natural flow. This system was devised by one of the project's designers who falsely claimed to be an engineer.

The Lower Churchill Project in Newfoundland and Labrador, slated for completion in 2021, overran its initial Can$6.2 billion budget by more than 6 billion. Current Nalcor Energy CEO Stan Marshall has described the project as a boondoggle.

The California High-Speed Rail has also been criticized as a boondoggle due to major cost overruns and long delays in construction. When originally proposed in 2008, the project cost was estimated to be $40 billion with a proposed completion date in 2022. The projected cost has since increased to as high as $98 billion with rail service not projected to begin until 2029 at the earliest.

Since 2014, the US Public Interest Research Group has documented 58 highway boondoggle projects that have been planned, cancelled or constructed. In all, these 58 projects cost US taxpayers $135 billion in capital costs, as well as constantly increasing maintenance costs.

=== Military projects ===
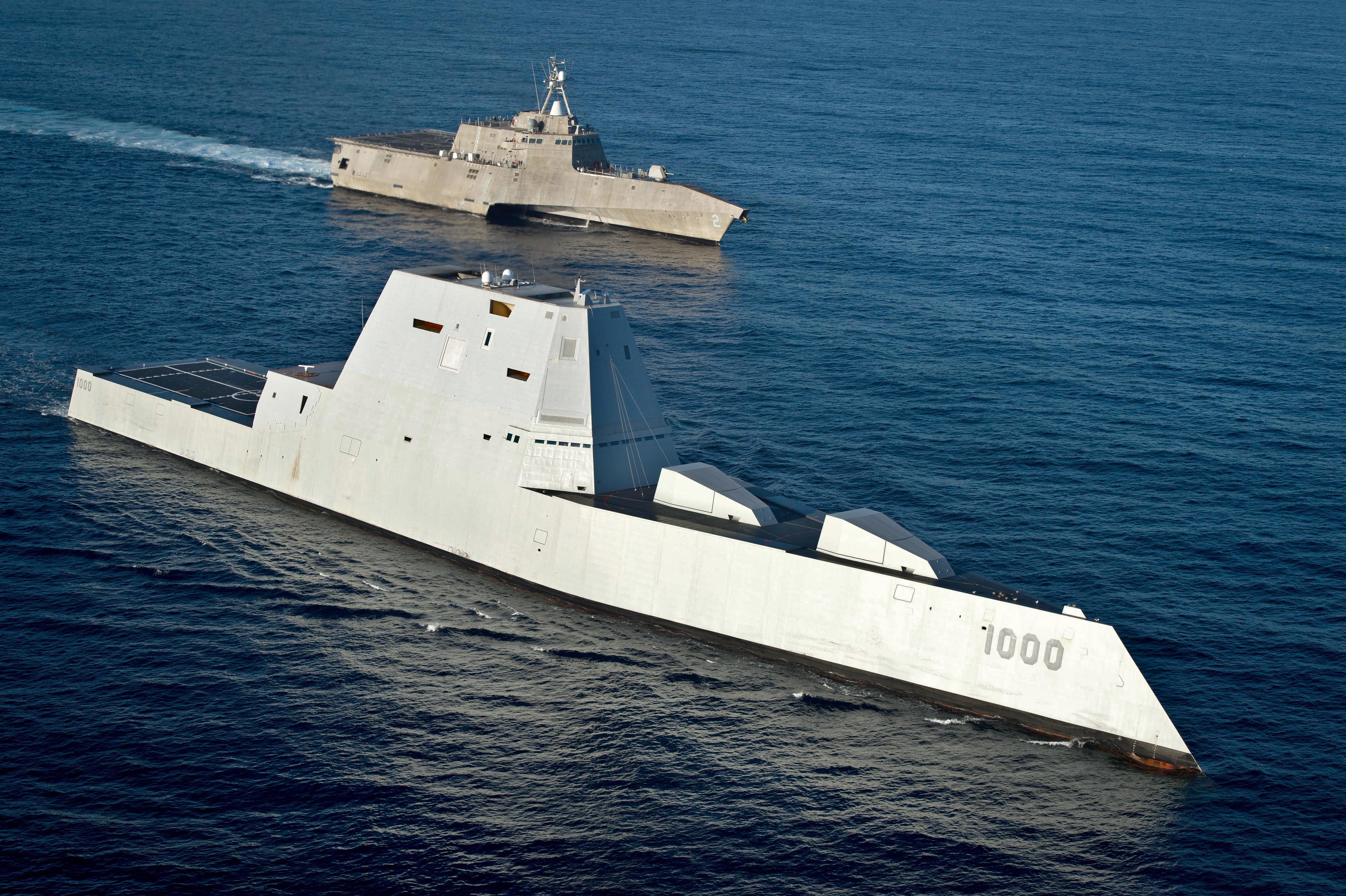
Zumwalt-class destroyer and Littoral combat ship

The F-35 Joint Strike Fighter program has suffered massive cost and schedule overruns and the fighter's military utility is the subject of heated controversy, yet the program continues to be the highest priority procurement activity for the United States Department of Defense.

The Zumwalt-class destroyer and Littoral combat ship have been described similarly.

=== Companies ===
The RCA "SelectaVision" video disk system project begun in the early 1960s and continuing for nearly 20 years, long after cheaper and better alternatives had come to market. RCA was estimated to have spent about $750 million (1985 dollars) (equivalent to $1.65 billion in 2014 dollars) on this commercially nonviable system, which was one of the factors leading to its sale to GE and later breakup in 1986.

Target Canada opened 133 stores starting in 2013 but shut down completely after two years, producing a write-down for its parent company of over 5 billion US dollars. The fiasco was set into motion by Target acquiring almost $2 billion worth of leases from the defunct retailer Zellers, which compelled Target to hurriedly open more than 100 stores without a working supply chain in place.

== Successful boondoggles ==
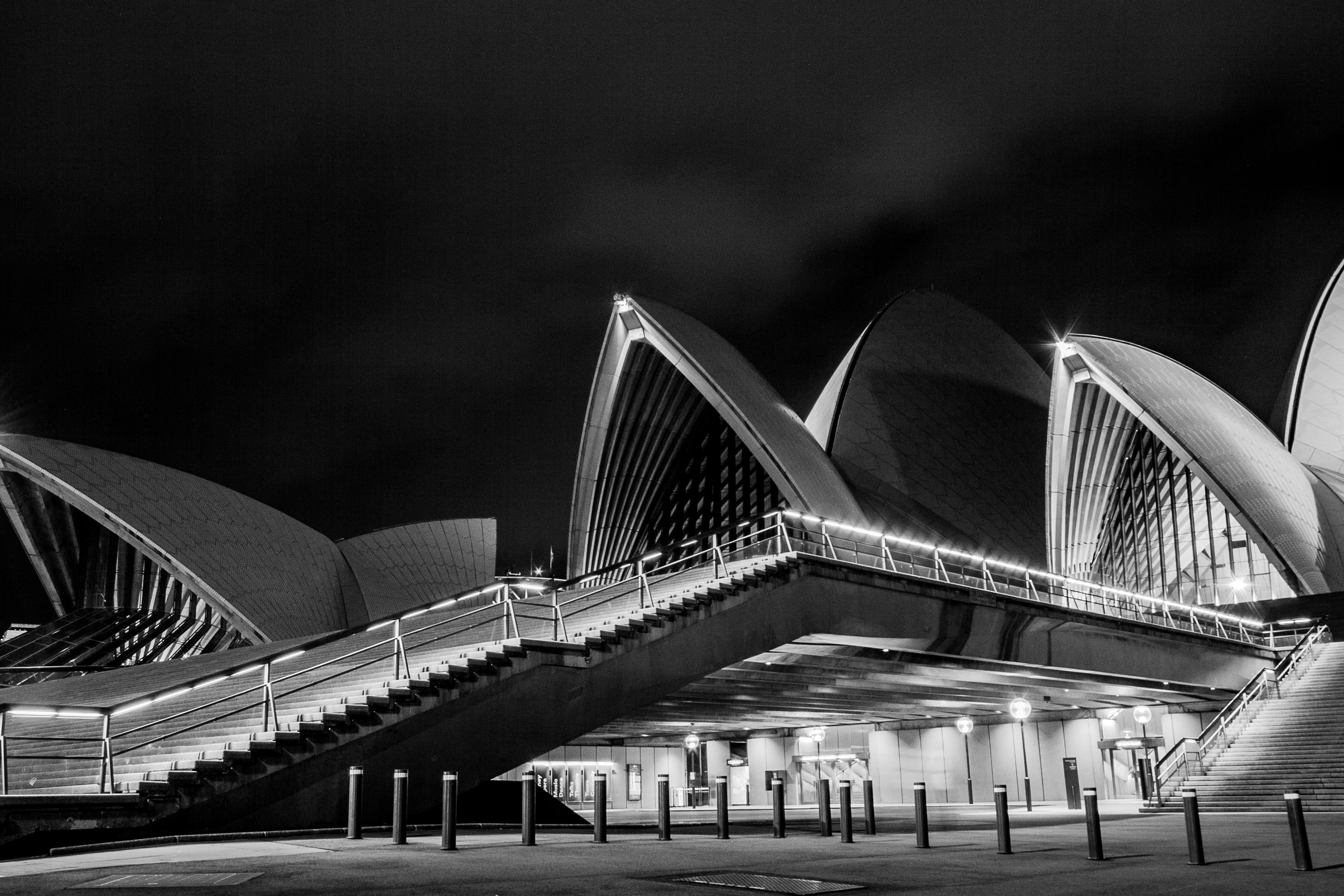
The Sydney Opera House was completed ten years late and 1,400% over budget

While time and cost overruns are a common factor in declaring a project a boondoggle, that does not necessarily mean the project has no benefit. For example, the cost of construction of the Sydney Opera House ballooned over 1,400 percent, but the building has since become an icon for the city and for Australia.

Another example is the Windscale nuclear reactor, built in the late 1940s in England, where a set of air scrubbers (nicknamed "Cockcroft's Folly") were added late in the project's construction, at great expense and complication. However, the amount of radioactive fallout released by the 1957 Windscale fire was substantially reduced by the presence of the scrubbers.

Kōtoku Wamura (often spelled Kotaku Wamura), a ten-term mayor of Fudai, Iwate, Japan, built a 16-metre (52 ft)-high seawall during the 1970s to protect the village from tsunamis. The village council balked at the size of the wall and the cost, but Wamura persuaded them that it was the only way to protect lives. When the tsunami of 11 March 2011 struck Fudai, the village was left virtually untouched, and residents now visit Wamura's grave to pay their respects.

After its launch in 1990, and the discovery that a flaw in its optics meant that the Hubble Space Telescope was unable to carry out most of its science objectives, it was described as a "techno turkey". A repair mission in 1993 restored its capabilities, and successive maintenance missions have allowed it to be an invaluable tool for observation and understanding of the universe.

The public being against the expenses for the space program, particularly a US majority during the Apollo program, is called "moondoggle", expessed among other things by the famous poem "Whitey on the Moon" (1970).

== See also ==
- Albatross (metaphor)
- Benefit shortfall
- Bridge to nowhere
- Development hell
- Escalation of commitment
- Government failure
- Guns versus butter model
- Opportunity cost
- Perverse subsidies
- Pork barrel politics
- Regulatory capture
- Rent-seeking
- Tilting at windmills
- Waffle-iron politics, Belgium
- White elephant
