= Vote trading =

Exchange of favors in voting, usually informally

Vote trading is the practice of voting in the manner another person wishes on a bill, position on a more general issue, or favored candidate in exchange for the other person's vote in the manner one wishes on another position, proposal, or candidate. Nearly all voting systems do not make vote trading a formal process, so vote trading is very often informal and thus not binding.

One form of vote trading that is formal is one that involves the trading of proxy voting rights – party A gets Party B's voting right formally, e.g. as a filled in proxy form with signature, perhaps authenticated by secretariats, and in this case party A may use B's vote on issue 1, and B uses A's vote on issue 2.

Vote trading can be a type of logrolling. For discussion of vote trading between individual voters, rather than legislators, see vote swapping.

== In legislatures ==
Vote trading frequently occurs between and among members of legislative bodies. For example, Representative A might vote for a dam in Representative B's district in exchange for Representative B's vote for farm subsidies in Representative A's district.

One of the first examples of vote trading to occur in the United States was the Compromise of 1790 in which Thomas Jefferson made a deal with James Madison and Alexander Hamilton to move the capital from New York to a site along the Potomac River, after it had long stayed in Philadelphia, in exchange for the federal assumption of debts incurred by the states in the Revolutionary War.

Hindrances to vote trading in the US Congress include its bicameral structure and the geographic representation basis of its members. Vote trading is encouraged, however, by Congress's relatively loose party discipline, which facilitates policy crossovers by individual members, in sharp contrast to European countries. In any case, vote trading is effectively a binding contract in the house, as both participants can actually see each other at the time of voting. If one party breaks their promise, the other might change its vote on the issues involved in the trade and later be rather unfriendly with the other.

== In corporations ==
Corporate vote trading has been proposed as a way of improving corporate governance. In this context, vote trading refers to borrowing shares of a stock in time to be the shareholder of record on the day of an important vote.

== Ethical considerations ==
The Limits of Public Choice: A Sociological Critique of the Economic Theory notes that vote trading is often considered immoral, since votes should be determined on the basis of the merits of the question. It is viewed as being less serious an offense than bribery, although in some countries it is still unlawful. However, vote-trading can also be viewed as beneficial to democracy in that it makes it possible for minorities to exert some influence and thus alleviate the tyranny of the majority. In this way, vote-trading is similar to coalition-building, which also involves an exchange of policies and bargaining over cabinet positions in order to gain the parliamentary majority needed for approval of the entire program.

== See also ==
- Heresthetic
- Horse trading#As a political term
- Logrolling
- Quid pro quo
- Vote pairing in the United States presidential election, 2016
