= Logrolling =

Trading of favors by legislative members

Logrolling is the trading of favors, or quid pro quo, such as vote trading by legislative members to obtain passage of actions of interest to each legislative member. In organizational analysis, it refers to a practice in which different organizations promote each other's agendas, each in the expectation that the other will reciprocate. In an academic context, the Nuttall Encyclopedia describes logrolling as "mutual praise by authors of each other's work". Where intricate tactics or strategy are involved, the process may be called horse trading.

== Concept and origin ==
There are three types of logrolling:

- Logrolling in direct democracies: a few individuals vote openly, and votes are easy to trade, rearrange, and observe. Direct democracy is pervasive in representative assemblies and small-government units
- Implicit logrolling: large bodies of voters decide complex issues and trade votes without a formal vote trade (Buchanan and Tullock 1962)
- Distributive logrolling: enables policymakers to achieve their public goals. These policymakers logroll to ensure that their district policies and pork barrel packages are put into practice regardless of whether their policies are actually efficient (Evans 1994 and Buchanan and Tullock 1962).

Distributive logrolling is the most prevalent kind of logrolling found in a democratic system of governance.

Quid pro quo sums up the concept of logrolling in the United States' political process today. Logrolling is the process by which politicians trade support for one issue or piece of legislation in exchange for another politician's support, especially by means of legislative votes (Holcombe 2006). If a legislator logrolls, he initiates the trade of votes for one particular act or bill in order to secure votes on behalf of another act or bill. Logrolling means that two parties will pledge their mutual support, so both bills can attain a simple majority. For example, a vote on behalf of a tariff may be traded by a congressman for a vote from another congressman on behalf of an agricultural subsidy to ensure that both acts will gain a majority and pass through the legislature (Shughart 2008). Logrolling cannot occur during presidential elections, where a vast voting population necessitates that individual votes have little political power, or during secret-ballot votes (Buchanan and Tullock 1962). Because logrolling is pervasive in the political process, it is important to understand which external situations determine when, why, and how logrolling will occur, and whether it is beneficial, efficient, or neither.

=== Origins ===
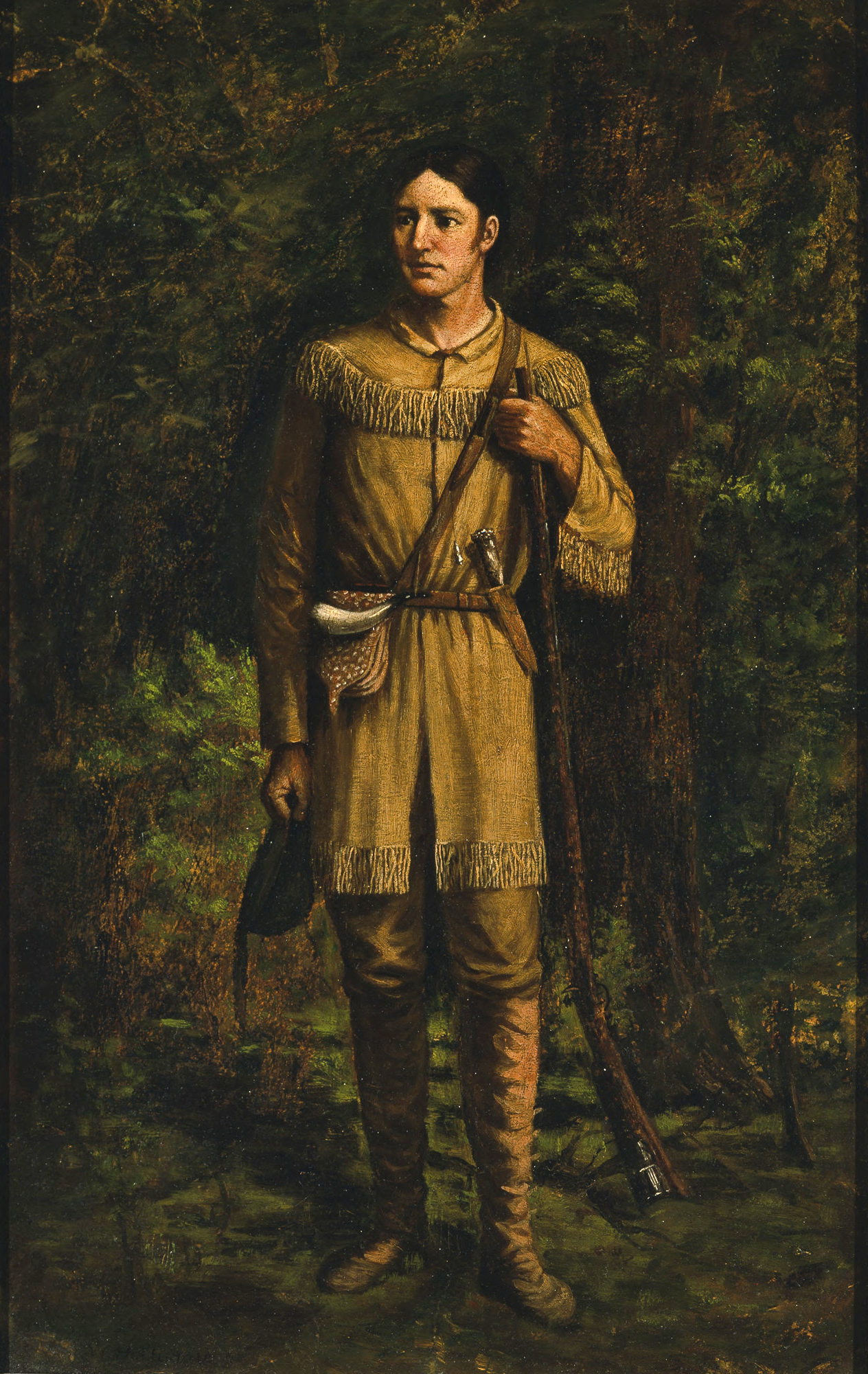
Davy Crockett by William Henry Huddle, 1889.

The widest accepted origin is the old custom of neighbors assisting each other with the moving of logs. If two neighbors had cut a lot of timber that needed to be moved, it made more sense for them to work together to roll the logs. In this way, it is similar to a barn-raising where a neighbor comes and helps a family build their barn, and, in turn, that family goes and returns the favor, helping him build his. Here is an example of the term's original use:

"A family comes to sit in the forest," wrote an observer in 1835; "Their neighbors lay down their employments, shoulder their axes, and come in to the log-rolling. They spend the day in hard labor, and then retire, leaving the newcomers their good wishes, and a habitation."

American frontiersman Davy Crockett was one of the first to apply the term to legislation:

The first known use of the term was by Congressman Davy Crockett, who said on the floor (of the U.S. House of Representatives) in 1835, "my people don't like me to log-roll in their business, and vote away pre-emption rights to fellows in other states that never kindle a fire on their own land."

=== Choice to logroll ===
Human beings, whether ignorant or informed, rational or irrational, logical or illogical, determine individual and group action through choices. Economics studies these choices, including the choice to logroll, and their particular influence within the market sector (Schwartz 1977). In America, political and economic decisions are usually made by politicians elected to legislative assemblies, and not directly by the citizenry (Buchanan and Tullock 1962). Although legislative votes are recorded and are available to the American public, legislators can exchange their votes on issues they do not care much about for votes on other issues that are more important to their personal agendas (Holcombe 2006). In The Calculus of Consent, James M. Buchanan and Gordon Tullock explore the relationship between individual choice in the voting process and in the marketplace, specifically within logrolling. Logrolling vote trades, like any activity within the marketplace, must be mutually beneficial (Buchanan and Tullock 1962).

A vote trade is like a legislative IOU. When a legislator needs a few more votes to acquire a simple majority, he will seek support through a vote exchange. He will promise a fellow legislator an IOU vote for another piece of legislation in return for a vote on his own act or bill. Legislators who logroll within a small body, for example, the U.S. House or Senate, have an incentive to honor their IOU votes because they cannot have their reputations tainted if they wish to be effective politicians (Holcombe 2006).

=== Logrolling and the role of preference ===
People have varying preferences, and make decisions at the margin to maximize their utility and improve their welfare. The same is true for legislators, who all enter office with different agendas, passions, and goals. Ideological diversity plays a significant role in the result of a vote and carries with it a significant cost. In addition, legislators will favor interests that offer them the most support. Legislative votes are determined by the intensity of personal preference, desires of constituents, and, ultimately, what will lead to the particular legislator's greatest utility. When people have ideologies at opposite ends of the political spectrum, it's difficult to ensure a simple majority, so buying a supermajority vote through logrolling may be the most cost effective (Buchanan and Tullock 1962).

In the General Possibility Theorem, Kenneth Arrow argues that if a legislative consensus can be reached through a simple majority, then minimum conditions must be satisfied, and these conditions must provide a superior ranking to any subset of alternative votes (Arrow 1963). A bill must be attractive to a legislator, or else he will not cast his vote for it. A vote, by the pure nature of the voting process, demonstrates explicit interest in whatever is voted upon. In logrolling, a superior ranking means that the marginal benefit of the vote is greater than any alternatives, so exchanging votes is worthwhile. The General Possibility Theorem necessitates that allocating one vote for another must constitute true utility and a sincere vote. Arrow's theory may place more restrictions and limitations on an individual voter's preferences than Buchanan and Tullock's; regardless, individuals will always choose the option they value most.

=== Logrolling to reach the optimal decision ===
Decisions reach an optimum only when they are unanimous, when votes are not coerced and everyone has veto power (Buchanan and Tullock 1962). Unanimous votes, however, are not required for the American voting process. This is why some logrolling advocates argue that logrolling must be allowed within a democracy—sometimes there may not be a "best" or "most efficient" option on a vote.

Logrolling creates a market within which votes are exchanged as a sort of currency, and thus, facilitates the political process that produces the highest valued outcomes (Holcombe 2006). If individual participants recognize the value of their own vote, they are motivated to trade. When methods of trade do not conflict with given standards or ethical procedures, individuals naturally seek mutually advantageous vote trades. An individual may effectually, but imperfectly, "sell" his vote on a particular issue to, in return, secure votes from other individuals on behalf of legislation he prefers (Buchanan and Tullock 1962).

Logrolling has one necessary condition: benefits from the public activity must be significantly more concentrated or localized than the costs. In economics, decisions are made at the margin. Logrolling depends on the reality that the marginal benefit (or utility) of at least some elected officials, or the citizenry, will increase when the legislation is passed (Buchanan and Tullock 1962). Any economist will consider the immediate opportunity cost of the logrolling procedure within the legislative body, as well as the external cost of the vote (the cost to enact and see the bill through to fruition).

When transaction costs are low and parties involved are perfectly informed, a mutually beneficial agreement will occur: whoever values the property the highest will end up with it. This is what Ronald H. Coase proposed in his Theory of Property Rights in 1960. This theory holds true within the world of economics. In the American system of government, legislators have the incentive to logroll because transaction costs are low. When transaction costs are low, the Coase theorem says that the political marketplace (the decisions of the legislatures) will allocate resources to the highest valued point (Coase 1960).

Typically, logrolling is a mechanism used to gain support for special interest and minority groups. However, because of the ideological mix that already exists within the legislature itself, minority views are often represented, even if only marginally. With low transaction costs, the Coase theorem will come into play. The highest valued outcome is chosen by the legislature, regardless the member's ideological stance or political affiliation (Holcombe 2006).

The problem of cyclical majorities may arise with the absence of logrolling. The cyclical majority problem occurs when voters are faced with multiple voting options but cannot choose the option they most prefer, since it is not available. Voters must consider whether the alternative option is closer to their original preference (Bara and Weale 2006). However, when logrolling is allowed, the highest valued outcome is secure without the threat of a cyclical majority. For example, suppose a country road in West Virginia is in disrepair. The local congressman proposes a bill to have the main road in his community resurfaced and paved. The road leads to a town of merely 600 residents. Thus, the other legislators will vote against the measure because the funding is not worthwhile to their constituents. In a logrolling system, the local legislator can use his vote to bargain with his fellow legislators. He will exchange his vote for his fellow legislators' bills to promote, for instance, the construction of new hospitals and the increase of veteran's benefits, in return for their votes to repair the road (Buchanan and Tullock 1962).

=== Logrolling: An example ===
Table 1-1
	Agriculture	Tax	Vote	School	Tax	Vote	Fire	Tax	Vote
Tanya	$300	$200	Y	$150	$200	N	$100	$200	N
Alvin	$150	$200	N	$350	$200	Y	$150	$200	N
Rebecca	$100	$200	N	$50	$200	N	$225	$200	Y
Total	$550	$600	Inefficient	$550	$600	Inefficient	$475	$600	Inefficient

Table 1-1 explains another example of logrolling. In the example, we have three individuals: Tanya, Alvin, and Rebecca. Tanya favors subsidies for agriculture, Alvin favors school construction, and Rebecca favors the recruitment of more firefighters. It seems as if the proposals are doomed to fail because each is opposed by a majority of voters. Even so, this may not be the outcome. Tanya may visit Rebecca and tell her that she will vote for Rebecca's bill to recruit more firefighters so long as Rebecca votes for her policy, subsidies for agriculture, in return. Now both proposals will win because they have gained a simple majority (Table 1-2), even though in reality the subsidy is opposed by two of the three voters. It's easy to see the Coase theorem at work in examples like this. Here, transaction costs are low, so mutually beneficial agreements are found, and the person who values the service the most will hold it (Browning and Browning 1979). Still, outcomes may be inefficient.

=== Efficient logrolling ===
Table 1-2
	Agriculture	Tax	Vote	School	Tax	Vote	Fire	Tax	Vote
Tanya	$350	$200	Y	$150	$200	N	$100	$200	Y
Alvin	$150	$200	N	$350	$200	Y	$200	$200	N
Rebecca	$125	$200	Y	$50	$200	N	$300	$200	Y
Total	$625	$600	Efficient	$550	$600	Inefficient	$600	$600	Efficient

If the sum of the total benefit of the legislation for all the voters is less than the cost of the legislation itself, the legislation is inefficient. Despite its inefficiency, however, it still may pass if logrolling is permitted. If Tanya trades her vote to recruit more firemen to Rebecca in exchange for Rebecca's vote in favor of agriculture subsidies, a mutually beneficial agreement will be reached, even though the outcome is inefficient. On the other hand, if the sum of the total benefit of the legislation for all voters is greater than the cost of the legislation itself, the legislation is efficient. If Tanya trades her vote once again for Rebecca's vote, both parties will reach a mutually beneficial agreement and an efficient outcome.

=== Minimum winning coalitions and logrolling ===
A minimum winning coalition is the smallest number of votes required to win the passage of a piece of legislation. Minimum winning coalitions demonstrate the importance of logrolling within a democracy, because the minimal winning coalition may be overthrown with the sway of a single vote. As previously mentioned, coalitions will buy a supermajority of votes if the support for the proposed legislation sways. If a legislator logrolls a few votes beyond the minimal winning coalition to his side, he will ensure that the final vote will be in favor of his legislation. In a way, vote trading does combine positions on distinct issues to form single legislative votes and packages (Stratmann 1992). Logrolled votes transcend affiliations and party lines and become feasible outcomes preferred by a majority or winning coalition (Schwartz 1977).

=== Logrolling in real politics ===
A problem in research is that it is impossible to identify vote trading directly within the House of Representatives or the Senate because roll call votes on specific goods are not observed (Irwin and Kroszner 1996). However, examples of refurbished bills can shed some light on the working-out of logrolling within the legislature. For example, in 1930, the Smoot-Hawley tariff, the second-highest tariff in U.S. history, passed the House and Senate. Congress voted to increase tariffs exponentially, which worked to push the United States from a stagnant recession into a plummeting depression (Irwin and Kroszner 1996). Strict party line votes suggest that partisan polarization in 1929 prevented the Smoot-Hawley bill from passing through Congress. The bill, however, was revamped, and legislators used logrolling to pass it through both chambers in 1930.

Omnibus bills can be an alternative market to logrolling. Various clauses are added to a bill to satisfy all involved parties sufficiently. However, large bills, like the Patient Protection and Affordable Care Act, require an in depth knowledge of 1,000 plus pages. Many sections of these types of bills are initially opposed but are later supported because of special benefit clauses (Evans 1994).

Because logrolling allows special-interest groups a voice in the political process, programs that benefit a minority group can get the approval of a majority. However, this may not be in the best interest of the majority. Special-interest groups typically do not represent the typical voter, but rather, small branches of minority ideologies (Holcombe 2006). Voting results with or without logrolling will differ only if the minority is more interested in an issue than the majority, enough to separate the marginal voters from the majority. Studies show that lobbying and political pressure exerted by special-interest groups are not atypical behavior in a modern democracy (Buchanan and Tullock 1962). Conditions imposed upon the social choice of the legislature imply a more severe restriction on the individual voter's preferences than the theory of logrolling presented by Buchanan and Tullock and presumed by Arrow's General Possibility Theory (Wilson 1969).

Critics reproach members of Congress for protecting their own electoral interests at the expense of the general welfare. Congressmen tend to distribute specialized benefits at a great cost and ignore the particular costs the legislation bears upon the taxpayers (Evans 1994). Legislators, who seek their personal benefit via logrolling even though it may not benefit those who must pay for the measure, are known as maximizers. Maximizers only take into account their personal cost and electability, instead of the effects of their actions on other parties involved. In short, other taxpayers will pay for the policy even if it does not affect them (Buchanan and Tullock 1962). Initially, maximizers will encourage other legislators to have the same selfish behavior because significant gains can be accrued in the short run. Buchanan and Tullock state that within a system of maximizers, all individuals are worse off than if they had all adopted Kantian norms of behavior.

Legislative bodies can expect higher government spending and taxation when logrolling is allowed to flourish. Logrolling does not imply excessive spending; members can trade tax reductions just as easily as they can trade pork barrel policies. The problem is that benefits of a vote only reach a particular portion of the population, while the tax costs that pay for the vote are spread throughout the entire populace, especially when the act depends on revenue from sales or income taxes. Benefits are concentrated in localities, and the costs are dispersed throughout the nation. Committee members can thus exploit pork barrel projects for electoral purposes. The citizenry is seen as a "common pool," used to finance projects through taxes. Somehow the citizens end up paying higher taxes than those who are not in a logroll system (Dalenberg and Duffy-Deno 1991 and Gilligan and Matsusaka 1995). In a system where logrolling is permitted, a third party may bear the cost of the project, rather than those who receive the full benefit of the legislation. This is always inefficient.

The logic of collective action shows that votes for bills are motivated by politicians and are determined by a simple majority (Olson 1971). Politicians are in the game to win it. Collective effort explains why farms acquire government subsidies at the expense of millions of consumers and why those in the textile industry benefit at the expense of clothing buyers (Shughart 2008). Congressional committees ensure that each committee leader will create legislative coalitions to push his policies to fruition. Thus, ceteris paribus, members who receive such projects, are likely to vote in support of their leader's wishes (Evans 1994).

Policymakers and congressmen have goals of power, and making their own mark in public policy, not pure aims of reelection (Dodd 1977). Reelection does play a great part in the legislative process as a condition to achieving any other political goal. Thus, logrolling can be a powerful tool for committee chairs, who control the voting agendas (Evans 1994). While committee leaders create the supermajority, they try to achieve their personal goals and help a bare majority of members achieve theirs. A skilled policy-oriented committee leader often seeks to exploit the goals of other members in order to construct legislation he or she will prefer (Arnold 1979 and Strahan 1989).

==== Wafelijzerpolitiek ====
Wafelijzerpolitiek (lit. waffle iron politics) is a form of logrolling used in Belgium. Until the split of the unitary Belgium in several parts, the unitary government decided on the funds given to big projects. As there were usually two opposing groups of about equal size in Belgium, this norm resulted in the approval of two equally sized projects in the two parts of the country, with the funds given to the two projects being equal. As a result, one project was always overfunded. Many see wafelijzerpolitiek as the source of Belgium's high debt.

After the first state reformation in 1988, many big projects were decided regionally, so the number of wafelijzer projects went down. There are still some things that fall under the supervision of the federal government, where wafelijzerpolitiek still happens. One example is the Belgian railway network.

Another result of the wafelijzerpolitiek is the big useless works. As Flanders is a part of Belgium with many ports (e.g., big ports in Antwerp and Zeebrugge), for every investment in Flemish waterways there had to be an investment in Walloon waterways. Some results are the Ronquières inclined plane and the Strépy-Thieu boat lift.

=== Simple referendums ===
In a referendum on a simple issue, the voter cannot easily trade his own vote for a vote on a reciprocal favor. This is because first, he is unsure as to when and how the other issues will be voted upon, and second, he and his immediate neighbors represent a fraction of the total electorate. Thus, trading may not be worthwhile (Buchanan and Tullock 1962).

Vote trading under a democratic, majority-rule institution is sometimes considered morally reprehensible behavior. However, the only perfect solution to rid the political system of distributive logrolling would be to develop a specific formula to weigh the costs and benefits of legislation perfectly and only allow efficient programs to be enacted (This is inconceivable. Therefore, logrolling must occur, but only by observing the constitutional rules that have been laid down as safeguards of democracy (Buchanan and Tullock 1962).

=== Summary ===
The reality is that transaction costs are high, and most voters, who are ignorant of political issues and the political process, see little incentive to attempt to influence their local legislator's political decisions (Holcombe 2006). It is also difficult for voters to be informed of their legislator's voting habits. Because of this, distributive logrolling will occur in democratic systems. Furthermore, it is the responsibility of the legislator to measure the costs and benefits of legislation and determine what is most efficient for his constituents. Logrolling will occur only if members of the legislature fail to gather enough votes for the passage of specific legislation. In essence, logrolling is a legal way to manipulate voter preference toward either an efficient or an inefficient outcome that would not otherwise be enacted (Browning 1979).

== Legality ==
Logrolling is illegal in numerous jurisdictions, and in some instances is a crime. Sophisticated computational techniques have been developed for the detection and prosecution of this crime.

== Other usages ==
Spy Magazine ran a feature entitled "Logrolling in Our Time" that cited suspicious or humorous examples of mutually admiring book jacket blurbs by pairs of authors. Private Eye magazine regularly draws attention to alleged logrolling by authors in "books of the year" features published by British newspapers and magazines.

Log rolling or a hodgepodge legislation in the Philippines also refers to any legislation that have several subjects on unrelated matters combined together. It is expressed in Article 6 Section 26.1 of the 1987 Philippine Constitution as a guarantee to prevent surprise or fraud from the legislature.

== See also ==
- Barn raising
- Bee (gathering)
- Blog roll
- Political corruption, which can overlap in instances where logrolling is corrupted by personal gain
  - Pay to play
- Vote trading
