= Vote pairing in the 2016 United States presidential election =

Vote pairing in the 2016 United States presidential election refers to vote pairing that occurred between United States citizens domiciled in different states during the 2016 United States presidential election.

== Background ==
Vote pairing occurs when two people commit to voting in a mutually agreed upon manner. In United States presidential elections, vote pairing usually comes in the form of voters from "safe" states, or non-swing states, voting for third-party candidates, and voters from swing states voting for their second-preference candidate. This form of vote pairing encourages third-party support while minimizing the risk that the more favored major-party candidate will lose electoral votes in the nationwide election (i.e., the "spoiler effect"). In the 2016 United States presidential election, this has usually manifested in the form of supporters in swing states of Libertarian candidate Gary Johnson and Green Party candidate Jill Stein swapping votes with supporters in blue states of Democratic candidate Hillary Clinton.

Vote pairing was used in the 2000 United States presidential election, where Al Gore supporters were concerned that votes for the left-leaning third-party candidate, Ralph Nader, could siphon off critical support for Al Gore in swing states like Florida. As the election neared, several "Nader Trader" websites emerged. Through these websites, a Nader supporter in swing state Florida could promise to vote for Gore, and in exchange, a Gore supporter in a strongly Democratic state like California would promise to vote for Nader. However, word didn't spread fast enough and vote pairing had a negligible effect on the electorate.

In the 2004, 2008, and 2012 presidential elections, vote pairing was rarely used or talked about, possibly because there were no third party candidates who seriously challenged the major-party candidates.

In the 2016 presidential election, the terms "vote pairing", "vote swapping", and "vote trading" have all been used by media outlets to describe the same basic phenomenon.

== Vote pairing sites ==
=== Vote pairing schemes ===
Several vote pairing sites have been created during the 2016 United States presidential election; among them are Trump Traders, the #NeverTrump app, Balanced Rebellion, VotePact, and MakeMineCount. These vote pairing sites fall in three broad categories:

1. A Hillary Clinton voter from an uncontested state (one that is definitely Democratic or definitely Republican) agrees to vote for a third-party candidate (such as Libertarian Party candidate Gary Johnson or Green Party candidate Jill Stein), and in exchange, a supporter of the third-party candidate from a swing state agrees to vote for Clinton. This has no effect on the total number of votes received by each candidate but it does give Clinton more votes in a swing state, and therefore improves the probability of Clinton winning the election.
2. Multiple Hillary Clinton voters from an uncontested state (one that is definitely Democratic or definitely Republican) agree to vote for a third-party candidate, and in exchange, a supporter of the third-party candidate from a swing state agrees to vote for Clinton. This has two effects: it increases the number of votes received by the third-party candidate nationwide, while still increasing Clinton's chances of winning the election.
3. Democratic and Republican voters whose first preference is a third-party candidate, but who were considering voting for a major party candidate to avoid the spoiler effect, decide to both vote for their first preference third-party candidate. This increases the total number of votes that the third-party candidate receives. If the paired voters are from the same state, it should have no effect on the election outcome, but if they are from different states, it could affect the outcome.

=== List of vote pairing sites and their key attributes ===
Site	Type	Launch date	Who runs it	Where it runs
#NeverTrump	1	App launched August 2016; automated matching feature launched October 16, 2016	Trimian Inc.	Supporters of third party candidates must be from a swing state (as determined by the app); supporters of Clinton must be from any other state
MakeMineCount	1	Site launched August 14, 2016	Technical execution was mainly completed by Steve Hull of Oakland, CA	Supporters of third party candidates must be from a swing state (as determined by the site); supporters of Clinton must be from any other state
Trump Traders	1 and 2 (ran both)	October 17, 2016	Republicans for Clinton in 2016 (R4C16)	Supporters of third party candidates must be from a swing state (currently those are considered to be Florida, North Carolina, Ohio, Pennsylvania, or Texas); supporters of Clinton must be from any other state
Balanced Rebellion	3	Site launched August 26, 2016	AlternativePAC	Any state
VotePact	3	Site launched July 22, 2008	Sam Husseini	Any state

=== #NeverTrump app ===
Launched by Amit Kumar, the app seeks to give a voice to both Hillary and third-party voters. The end goal of this, as the name suggests, is to prevent Donald Trump from being elected. The premise is that third-party voters in swing states are matched with Hillary voters in blue states. This makes it so Hillary gets more swing state votes and third-party candidates get their vote counted.

The app has two main functions:

1. The app goes through a user's existing contacts and tells them who is from a swing state. It then encourages the user to reach out and possibly swap votes with one of their contacts. Users can also message their contacts, reminding them to vote.
2. The app uses an automated matching system which draws from the user's interests (such as civil rights) and matches the user with five voters who share similar interests. Then the user can look at their profiles and begin chatting with any of them

The #NeverTrump app has between 500 and 1000 installs on Google Play, and more than a thousand users in total.

=== MakeMineCount ===
A Stein or Johnson supporter in a swing state is matched with a Clinton supporter in an uncontested state.

Registered users are matched on the website, and then take it from there.

=== Trump Traders ===
Trump Trades connects third-party supporters from swing states with Hillary Clinton supporters in uncontested states (definitely Democratic or definitely Republican states), with the third-party supporter agreeing to vote for Clinton and the Clinton supporter agreeing to vote for the third party. For a while, Trump Traders offered a 2:1 exchange rate: a single third-party supporter could vote for Clinton in exchange for getting two Clinton supporters to change their vote. According to Republicans for Clinton in 2016 co-founder John Stubbs, most users are matched within 1 to 2 hours. As of October 31 more than 10,000 voters have signed up for Trump Traders.

After being matched, two users sort out everything else on their own.

=== Balanced Rebellion ===
The premise is that a disgruntled Trump voter and a disgruntled Clinton voter agree to both vote for Gary Johnson. The site then matches two users to allow them to work things out.

AlternativePAC's chief Matt Kibbe reported that as of September 7, 2016, 33,393 Democrats and 33,036 Republicans have signed up, for a total of 66,429 signed up and 30,819 successful matches made, covering 61,638 people.

Balanced Rebellion has created several viral videos with the goal of spreading their message. Their comedy video "What Abe Lincoln Prophesied About Trump and Hillary" has over 35 million views and 750 thousand shares on Facebook as of November 2, 2016.

=== VotePact ===
Disenchanted Republicans pair up with disenchanted Democrats and both vote for third party or independent candidates instead of voting for the two establishment parties. By forming this pact, the major-party candidates on both sides are deprived of one vote. This prevents the spoiler effect from happening.

Individuals wishing to vote pact must find matches by themselves. VotePact has set up a Facebook page to help facilitate the process.

== Criticism ==
One criticism of vote pairing is that vote pairing agreements are unenforceable, given the secret ballot, as well as the fact that vote pairing agreements are not legal contracts, and thus not legally binding.

Stein campaign co-chair Gloria Mattera has been critical of vote pairing schemes of type (1) and (2), stating that the campaign's position on vote pairing is that it is a failed strategy because voting for the "lesser evil" had led to the most disliked and distrusted major party candidates in history, and that instead Americans should vote for the candidate who best represents their interests.

Other criticisms of vote pairing consist of arguments against supporting third-parties in the first place. One criticism is that helping third parties could hurt the Democratic Party in future elections, because if a third party secures 5% of the total votes, they are entitled to federal funds, and can then siphon off more votes from the Democratic Party in future elections.

== Legality ==
The main vote-swapping site in the 2000 United States presidential election, voteswap2000.com, was shut down by California's Republican secretary of state, Bill Jones, only four days after it opened. A second vote-swapping site, votexchange.com, was never directly threatened but also ceased operations because of what happened to voteswap2000. Before it was shut down, voteswap2000 had brokered 5,041 vote-swaps, including hundreds in Florida.

On August 6, 2007, the Ninth Circuit Court of Appeals ruled on a case, Porter v. Bowen, stemming from the California attorney general's shutdown of voteswap2000.com. Vote-swapping, it said, is protected by the First Amendment, which state election laws can't supersede, and it is fundamentally different from buying or selling votes. Furthermore, vote pairing agreements are not legally binding.
