= Kōtoku Wamura =

Japanese politician (1909–1997)

- 和村 幸得
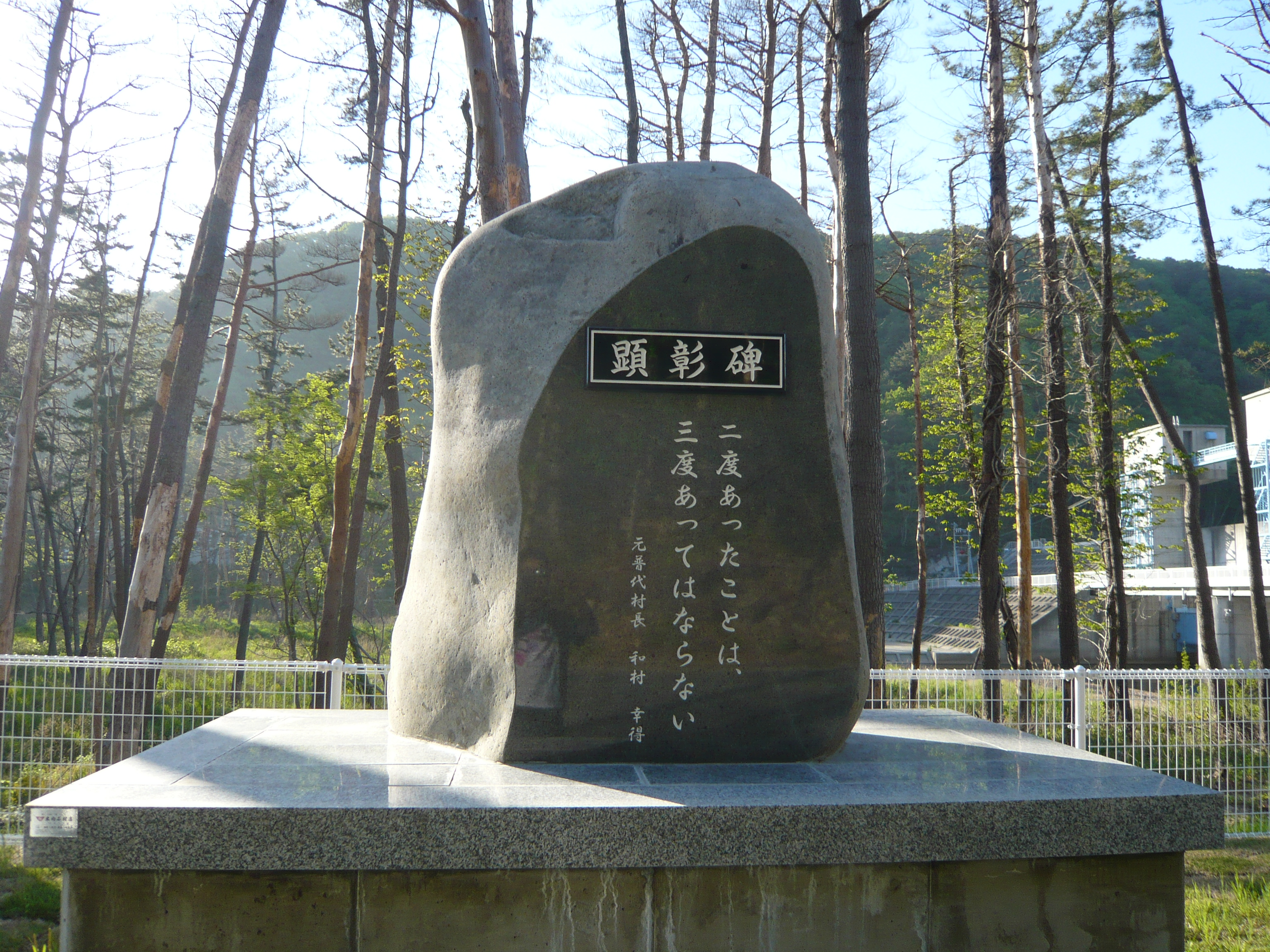
- Monument to Wamura

Mayor of Fudai
- In office 5 April 1947 – 30 April 1987
- Preceded by: Yutaka Ōtsubo
- Succeeded by: Yoshio Iwazawa

Personal details
- Born: 21 February 1909 Fudai, Iwate, Japan
- Died: 18 October 1997 (aged 88) Fudai, Iwate, Japan
- Party: Independent
- Education: Keio University

Kōtoku Wamura (Japanese: 和村幸得, Hepburn: Wamura Kōtoku; 21 February 1909 – 18 October 1997) was a Japanese politician who was the mayor of Fudai in Iwate Prefecture from 1947 to 1987. He was credited with creating the floodgates that saved the village of Fudai, Iwate from the 2011 Tōhoku earthquake and tsunami.

== Biography ==
Wamura was born in Fudai in 1909. He attended Morioka Junior High School, now Morioka First High School, and later studied at Keio Gijuku. He returned to Fudai after suffering from poor health and subsequently worked for the Iwate prefectural government.

Wamura personally experienced the tsunami caused by the 1933 Sanriku earthquake. Fudai records 137 victims from the disaster. In his later memoir, Wamura recalled witnessing bodies being recovered from debris following the tsunami, an experience that influenced his subsequent commitment to tsunami protection.

Wamura left his position with the prefectural government to run for mayor and was elected in April 1947 at the age of 38. He ultimately served ten consecutive terms over a period of 40 years. During his administration, Wamura made the reduction of poverty a central objective and promoted the development of Fudai's fishing industry, including improvements to its fishing ports and the expansion of aquaculture.

Wamura retired as mayor on 30 April 1987. In his farewell remarks to village employees, he urged his successors to persist with projects that they believed would benefit residents even when they encountered opposition. He was subsequently named Fudai's first honorary citizen. He died in 1997 at the age of 88.

== Flood-control projects ==
Fudai had experienced destructive tsunamis before Wamura became mayor. The village records 302 victims from the tsunami caused by the 1896 Sanriku earthquake and 137 from the 1933 tsunami. Wamura's experience of the latter disaster and knowledge of the earlier tsunami shaped his determination to construct coastal defenses capable of withstanding unusually large waves.

In 1967, Fudai completed the Otanabe seawall after six years of construction. The structure was 15.5 metres high and 155 metres long and cost ¥58.37 million to build. Its height reflected the approximately 15.2-metre tsunami height recorded locally following the 1896 earthquake.

Wamura subsequently promoted construction of the Fudai Floodgate. Work began in 1972 and continued for 12 years, with the structure completed in 1984 at a cost of ¥3.56 billion. The floodgate is 15.5 metres high and extends 205 metres across the Fudai River valley.

The scale and cost of the flood-control projects encountered opposition from residents and government officials. Critics questioned whether structures of such height were necessary and argued that the money could be used for other purposes. Wamura defended the projects with the principle that "what has happened twice must not happen a third time".

Construction of the floodgate also required the acquisition of privately held land. In April 1980, the governor of Iwate Prefecture submitted an application for authorization to acquire land for the project under the Land Expropriation Act. The Ministry of Construction determined that the project met the law's public-interest requirements and formally authorized the expropriation that July.

=== 2011 tsunami ===
During the 2011 Tōhoku earthquake and tsunami, workers closed the main gates of the Fudai Floodgate after the earthquake. Some of its smaller gates failed to close automatically and had to be shut manually. The tsunami reached approximately 20 metres at the floodgate and overtopped the 15.5-metre structure, but the gate substantially reduced the force and extent of the inundation behind it. The Otanabe seawall similarly prevented serious inundation of the residential area behind it.

Fudai's fishing port and other facilities outside the defenses suffered extensive destruction, including damage to boats, equipment and warehouses. Within the protected area, however, no homes were swept away and there were no confirmed deaths. One resident remained missing after going to check on his boat following the earthquake.

The comparatively limited damage in Fudai attracted national and international attention after the disaster, particularly because many other communities along the Sanriku Coast had suffered extensive destruction. Residents subsequently visited Wamura's grave to pay their respects for his role in establishing the village's tsunami defenses.

On 24 March 2013, Fudai erected a monument near the floodgate honoring Wamura and his role in the construction of the village's tsunami defenses. The monument was intended both to express the villagers' gratitude and to preserve his warning that the lessons of earlier tsunami disasters should not be forgotten.

== Written works ==
- A 40-Year Fight Against Poverty (Japanese: 貧乏との戦い四十年; Hinbō to no tatakai yonjūnen) (1988), Wamura's memoir of his years in Fudai and municipal government.
