= Vote swapping =

When two people commit to voting in a mutually agreed way

Vote swapping, also called co-voting or vote pairing or vote trading, is an informal strategic agreement between two voters to "exchange" their votes, in order to vote tactically and maximize the chances that their preferred candidates will win election. Vote swapping avoids wasted votes (and the "spoiler effect") by shifting votes from uncompetitive districts to competitive districts.

In a vote swapping agreement, Voter 1 in District A commits to vote for Voter 2's preferred candidate in District A, and Voter 2 in District B commits to vote for Voter 1's preferred candidate in District B.

For example, consider elections in the United Kingdom: In constituency A, the race is tight between a Labour and a Conservative candidate. In constituency B, the race is tight between a Liberal Democrat and a Conservative candidate. A Liberal Democrat voter in constituency A would agree to vote Labour, and in exchange, a Labour voter in constituency B would agree to vote Liberal Democrat. This makes it more likely for either Labour or the Liberal Democrats to win that seat from the Conservatives.

In the United States, United Kingdom, and Canada, the process has been subjected to legal challenge and been deemed legal.

== Legality ==
=== Canada ===
In Canada, vote swapping with other people in Canada is legal per the Elections Act, as long as there is no money or "material benefit" that passes hands in the vote swap agreement. It's also illegal to trick someone using a false identity to influence someone to vote in a different way.

=== United States ===
In the United States, it is illegal to buy or sell votes. In the 2000 presidential election, graduate students created a satirical web site for buying and selling votes, vote-auction.com, which was shut down by an Illinois judge.

Opponents of vote swapping claim that it is illegal to give or accept anything that has pecuniary value in exchange for a vote. Proponents for vote pairing respond that vote pairing does not involve any pecuniary or monetary exchange. Instead, vote swapping is simply an informal, nonbinding agreement between people to vote strategically. In addition, vote pairing is a routine practice in legislative bodies, such as Congress and city councils.

The debate regarding the legality of vote pairing peaked during the 2000 presidential election, when there was a strong effort to shut down the U.S. vote-pairing websites. On October 30, 2000, eight days before the November 2000 United States presidential elections, California Secretary of State Bill Jones threatened to prosecute voteswap2000.com, a California-based vote pairing website. In response, voteswap2000.com and votexchange2000.com immediately shut their virtual doors. The site operators, Alan Porter (votexchange2000.com) and William Cody (voteswap2000.com), and two potential users of the sites, Patrick Kerr and Steven Lewis, took the state of California to court. The district court was slow to respond and abstained from making any decision. In 2003, the 9th U.S. Circuit Court of Appeals overturned this abstention.

On August 6, 2007, the 9th Circuit ruled that California's threats violated the First Amendment, writing:

Both the websites' vote-swapping mechanisms and the communication and vote swaps that they enabled were constitutionally protected. At their core, they amounted to efforts by politically engaged people to support their preferred candidates and to avoid election results that they feared would contravene the preferences of a majority of voters in closely contested states. Whether or not one agrees with these voters' tactics, such efforts, when conducted honestly and without money changing hands, are at the heart of the liberty safeguarded by the First Amendment.

The 9th Circuit did not decide whether the threats violated the U.S. Constitution's Commerce Clause.

As of 2024, vote swapping remains legal, so long as no money or gifts are exchanged.

== History ==
=== Canada ===
Canadian voters extensively use strategic voting and strategic voting pledges. For example, during the 2015 federal election, strategic voting was used extensively against the Conservative government of Stephen Harper, which had benefited from vote splitting among centrist and left-leaning parties in the 2011 election. Following the landslide victory of the Liberals led by Justin Trudeau over Harper's Conservatives, experts argued that this dramatic increase in support for the Liberals at the expense of the NDP and Green Party was partially due to strategic voting for Liberal candidates. In three weeks, 1.4 million voters switched from NDP to Liberal. In at least two closely-contested ridings, strategic voting websites obtained enough pledges to account for the victory margin of the Liberal candidate.

Vote swapping websites can also help voters switch votes from district to district, such as VotePair.ca (also PairVote.ca), created by Gerry Kirk. In the 2008 Canadian federal election, VotePair.ca claimed that 6,000 people registered to swap their vote and 2,800 successful vote swaps occurred. In the 2011 Canadian federal election, VotePair.ca claimed that 5,741 people had registered 1 week before the election, that 7,522 people registered in total, and that 1,713 swaps (for 3,426 votes) officially occurred, of which 838 were swapped into Greens, 1367 into NDP, and 1488 into Liberals.

=== United States ===
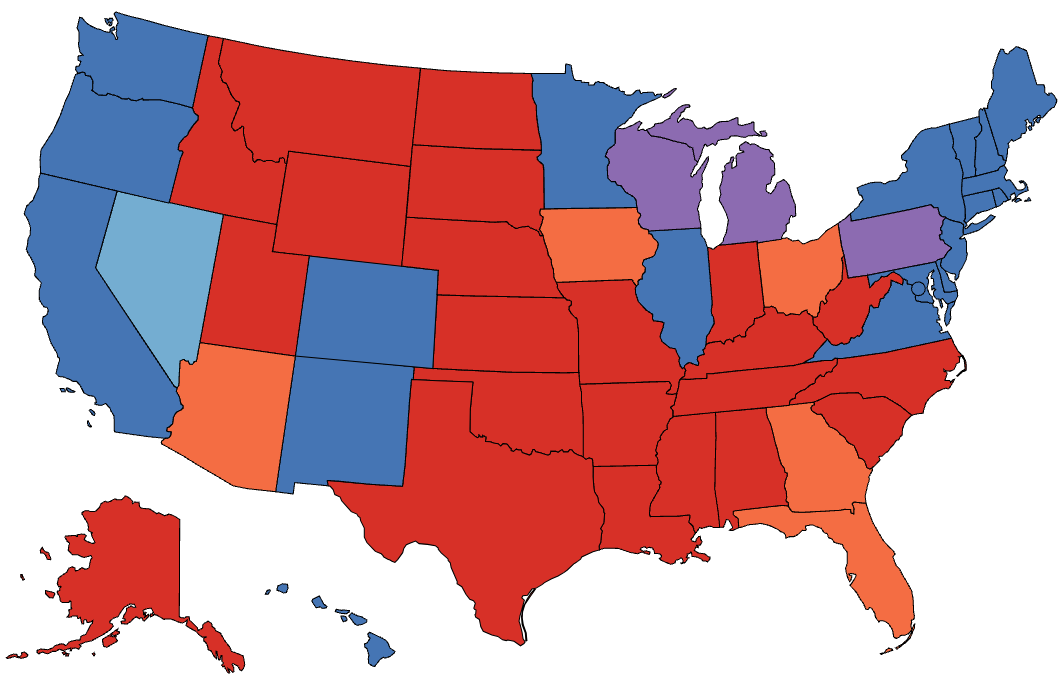
Summary of statewide results of the 2012, 2016, 2020 and 2024 presidential elections by state Won by the Republicans in all four elections Won by the Republicans in three of the four elections Won by each party twice in the four elections Won by the Democrats in three of the four elections Won by the Democrats in all four elections

Since 2000, voters have used vote swapping as a tactical voting strategy in U.S. presidential elections. In this practice, a third-party voter from a swing state reaches an agreement with a Democratic or Republican voter from a red state or blue state (or "safe state"). Under this agreement, the third-party voter pledges to support the other's major party candidate, and in exchange, the Dem/Rep voter pledges to support the other's minor party candidate. For example, a Green voter in Wisconsin might swap with a Democratic voter in California.

Under the United States Electoral College, all of a state's votes go to the winning presidential candidate for that state, no matter how close the margin, in a winner-take-all system. Third-party candidates for president frequently garner no Electoral College votes, but can siphon off total votes from the front runners in order to call attention to their causes. Vote-swapping agreements allow third-party candidates to get more of the popular vote, while the major-party candidate gets more of the Electoral College vote.

==== 2000 United States presidential election ====
The debate over the legality of vote swapping intensified in the final days of the 2000 election when six Republican state secretaries of state, led by the California Secretary of State Bill Jones, charged that vote-pairing web sites were illegal and threatened criminal charges against their creators. Multiple web sites had sprung up that were matching supporters of the Democratic presidential candidate, Al Gore, in non-swing states, with supporters in swing states of the strongest third-party candidate, Ralph Nader. Some argued that Ralph Nader was drawing support from left leaning Democrats that would otherwise vote for Al Gore. This would have allowed Nader to get more of the popular vote, or at least his fair share of it, and at the same time allowed Gore to perhaps get more of the Electoral College vote.

There are multiple reasons it would be important for Ralph Nader to still get his share of the national popular vote. One is that if he got five percent or more, then he could get federally distributed public funding in the next election. Also, and perhaps more importantly, he could possibly get included in the presidential debates for the next election in 2004. Third parties have protested their exclusion from the presidential debates.

In 2000, many of the vote pairing web sites were hosted in California, and so when the California Secretary of State, Bill Jones, charged that the web sites were illegal and threatened their creators with criminal prosecution, some (but not all) of the sites reluctantly shut down. The American Civil Liberties Union (ACLU) got involved to protect the web sites, seeking a restraining order against Jones and then a permanent injunction against him, alleging that he had violated the constitutional rights of the web site creators. However, the issue would only be resolved after the 2000 election had already occurred.

Votes swapped to Gore in Florida	1412
Bush's margin in final recount	537
Bush's margin in Dec 8 ruling	193

It is possible that Jones's threats, which shut down several vote-swapping websites, changed the outcome of the 2000 presidential election. After the election, votetrader.org tallied up the total number of voter swaps across all vote-swapping websites at 16,024, of which 1,412 were Nader-to-Gore voters in Florida. Florida Secretary of State Katherine Harris certified George W. Bush as winning Florida by just 537 votes, and certified Ralph Nader as winning 97,421 votes. Under this standard, if another 550 voters had swapped (about 0.5% of Nader's total), then Gore would have won. In their ruling on December 8, 2004, the Florida Supreme Court changed this margin to just 193 votes. Under this standard, if another 200 voters had swapped (about 0.2% of Nader's total), then Gore would have won. Put another way: If about 1,600 Nader supporters had vote paired instead of 1,400, Gore would have carried the election.

There were numerous other controversies in Florida's vote count: from the Palm Beach County butterfly ballots; to the question of whether Bush would have still won the state in a full recount; to how Katherine Harris, a Republican, was the co-chair of the Bush campaign in Florida at the same time she was the Florida state secretary of state. Notably, the California state secretary of state, Bill Jones, who charged that the vote-pairing web sites were illegal, was also a Republican supporter of George W. Bush. The federal Ninth Circuit Court of Appeals would eventually rule against him, but this decision did not come down until February 6, 2003, long after the 2000 election was already over. In the next presidential election, in 2004, the legality of the vote-pairing web sites went unquestioned. Indeed, the California state secretary of state for the 2004 election (a successor to Bill Jones) publicly announced, before that election, that vote pairing was legal.

Organization	Shut down after Jones threat	Signups	Swaps (2 voters each)	Swaps in Florida to Gore
nadergore.com	Shut down	221	98 (est)	15
nadergore.org		300	150	13 (est)
nadertrader.org		0	0	0
tradevotes.com		310	147	13 (est)
voteexchange.com		9698	3127	277 (est)
voteexchange.org		692	346	17
voteswap2000.com	Shut down	5000	2500	265
voteswap2000.net		6325	3102	322
votetrader.org		228	98	10
votexchange2000.com	Shut down	3000	1331 (est)	118 (est)
winwincampaign.org		10251	5125	362
Total (including estimates)		36025	16024	1412

==== 2016 United States presidential election ====
In 2016, four substantial vote swapping campaigns appeared. Two of these campaigns hoped to swap votes from Clinton supporters in safe states with supporters of third parties, such as NeverTrump Republican voters:

- The #NeverTrump app, created by Amit Kumar, sought to exchange votes between Clinton voters in safe states and third-party voters in swing states, in order to prevent Donald Trump from being elected. Kumar claimed that 16,000 people had signed up to trade. On November 8, the #NeverTrump app listed 10,568 "active traders", including about 550 people in Florida, 600 in Pennsylvania, and 250 in North Carolina.
- TrumpTraders.org, created by Republicans for Clinton in 2016 (R4C16), sought to exchange votes between Clinton voters in safe states and third-party voters in swing states, in order to prevent Donald Trump from being elected. TrumpTraders.org claimed that, by October 31, more than 10,000 voters had signed up. In November, TrumpTraders.org offered a 2:1 exchange rate, such that one third-party supporter could vote for Clinton, and in exchange, two Clinton supporters would vote for that third party. After the election, TrumpTraders.org claimed that over 45,000 voters had signed up, including 5,000 in Florida.

Two campaigns hoped to swap votes between one Democratic voter and one Republican voter, who would both agree to vote for a third party candidate such as Libertarian candidate Gary Johnson or Green candidate Jill Stein:

- Balanced Rebellion, created by libertarian super PAC AlternativePAC, sought to pair one disgruntled Trump voter and one disgruntled Clinton voter, who would both agree to vote for Libertarian candidate Gary Johnson. On September 7, 2016, AlternativePAC leader Matt Kibbe claimed that 66,429 people had signed up (33,393 Democrats, 33,036 Republicans) and 61,638 people had successfully matched (in 30,819 matches).
- VotePact.org, created in 2000 by Sam Husseini, sought to pair one disgruntled Trump voter and one disgruntled Clinton voter, who would both agree to vote for a third party candidate of their choice. However, VotePact had no process for matching voters beyond providing a common Facebook page.

Organization	Type of swap encouraged	Signup count	People matched
#NeverTrump	Swap between third-party voter in swing state (to vote for Clinton) and Democratic voter in safe state (to vote for third party)	16,000	
TrumpTraders.org	Swap between third-party voter in swing state (to vote for Clinton) and Democratic voter in safe state (to vote for third party)	45,000	
Balanced Rebellion	Pair between 1 disgruntled Democrat and 1 disgruntled Republican, to both vote Libertarian	66,429	61,638
VotePact	Pair between 1 disgruntled Democrat and 1 disgruntled Republican, to both vote third-party	no matching system	

==== 2024 United States presidential election ====
In 2024, the SwapYourVote.org campaign paired 1 swing state voter (who would vote for Kamala Harris) with 2 safe state voters (who would vote for Jill Stein or another protest candidate). The vast majority of vote swappers were opposed to the United States support for Israel in the Gaza war. In its first 2 weeks, SwapYourVote.org had 2,300 sign-ups. After the election, SwapYourVote.org claimed that 15,356 voters had signed up to swap, which would yield about 5,120 votes for Harris and 10,210 votes for protest candidates.

SwapYourVote.org also argued in favor of ranked-choice voting, which would remove the need to swap votes.

Organization	Type of swap encouraged	Signup count	People matched
SwapYourVote.org	Swap between third-party voter in swing state (to vote for Harris) and Democratic voter in safe state (to vote for third party)	15,356	

== Criticisms ==
Because vote swapping agreements are informal, and because ballots are secret, vote swapping agreements are not enforceable. Therefore, unlike legal contracts, vote swapping is not legally binding, and one or both swappers could fail to uphold their agreement.

In 2016, Stein campaign co-chair Gloria Mattera criticized vote pairing schemes, stating that the campaign's position on vote pairing is that it is a failed strategy because voting for the "lesser evil" had led highly distrusted major party candidates, and that Americans should instead vote for the candidate who best represents their interests.

Other criticisms of vote pairing consist of arguments against supporting third-parties in the first place. One criticism is that helping third parties could hurt the Democratic Party in future elections, because if a third party secures 5% of the total votes, they are entitled to federal funds, and can then siphon off more votes from the Democratic Party in future elections.

== Effectiveness ==
In 2016, Yale political science associate professor Alexander Coppock partnered with TrumpTraders.org to empirically test the effect of vote swapping. TrumpTraders randomly assigned 4500 third-party voters from swing states who signed up to either a control condition (not matched with a safe state voter) or a treatment condition (matched). Of control voters (not matched), 25% voted for Clinton regardless. Of treatment voters, 57% voted for Clinton, representing a 32 point (or 128%) increase. On this basis, Coppock argues that "vote swapping programs may be an effective campaign tactic to persuade third party voters to vote for major party candidates".

== Comparison with other voting systems ==
Vote pairing is most often used as a strategy in first-past-the-post voting with winner-takes-all constituencies, as they provide the strongest incentives for dishonesty. However, such a strategy can be effective when using ranked-choice voting as well. Instant-runoff systems are particularly vulnerable to the practice because they frequently fail the favorite betrayal criterion, which means casting a first-rank vote for a third-party can cause a "greater evil" candidate to win.

For example, in the 2009 Burlington mayoral election, voters who supported moderate Republican Kurt Wright eliminated Democrat Andy Montroll in the second round, allowing socialist candidate Bob Kiss to win. If a similar instant-runoff system were adopted nationwide, Republicans in Vermont would have a strong incentive to swap votes with Democrats in districts where the Democrat was unlikely to win. A similar situation occurred in the 2022 Alaska special election.

Most rated voting systems (including approval voting and score voting) satisfy the favorite betrayal criterion, rendering vote-pairing fully unnecessary. Proportional representation systems also make the practice less important (although it can still occur if there are regionally-calculated electoral thresholds).

== See also ==
- Condorcet method
- Instant-runoff voting
- National Popular Vote Interstate Compact
- Tactical voting
