= Waffle-iron politics =

Belgian political budgeting strategy

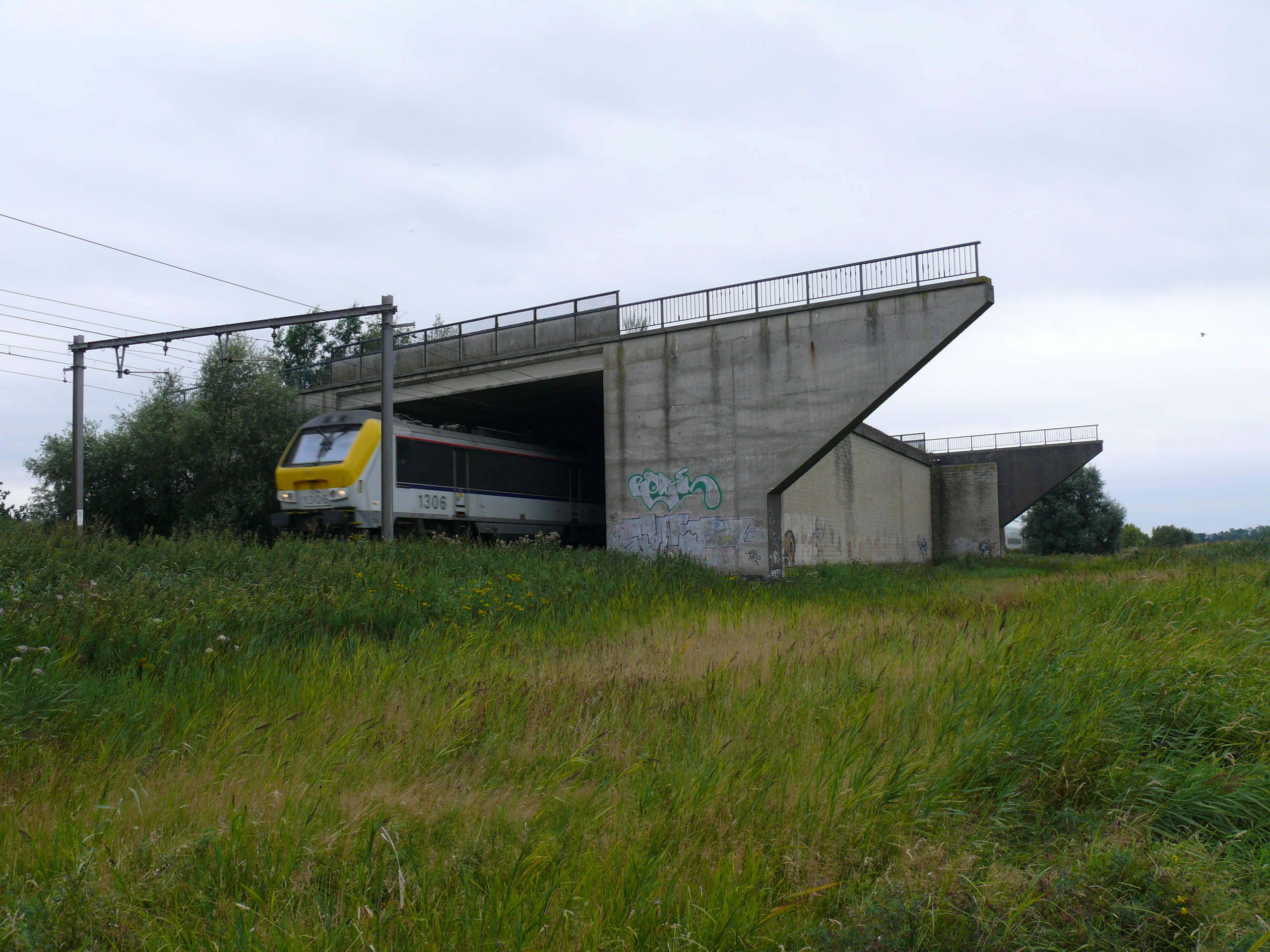
A bridge over a railway in Varsenare from 1976, never connected to roads on both ends.

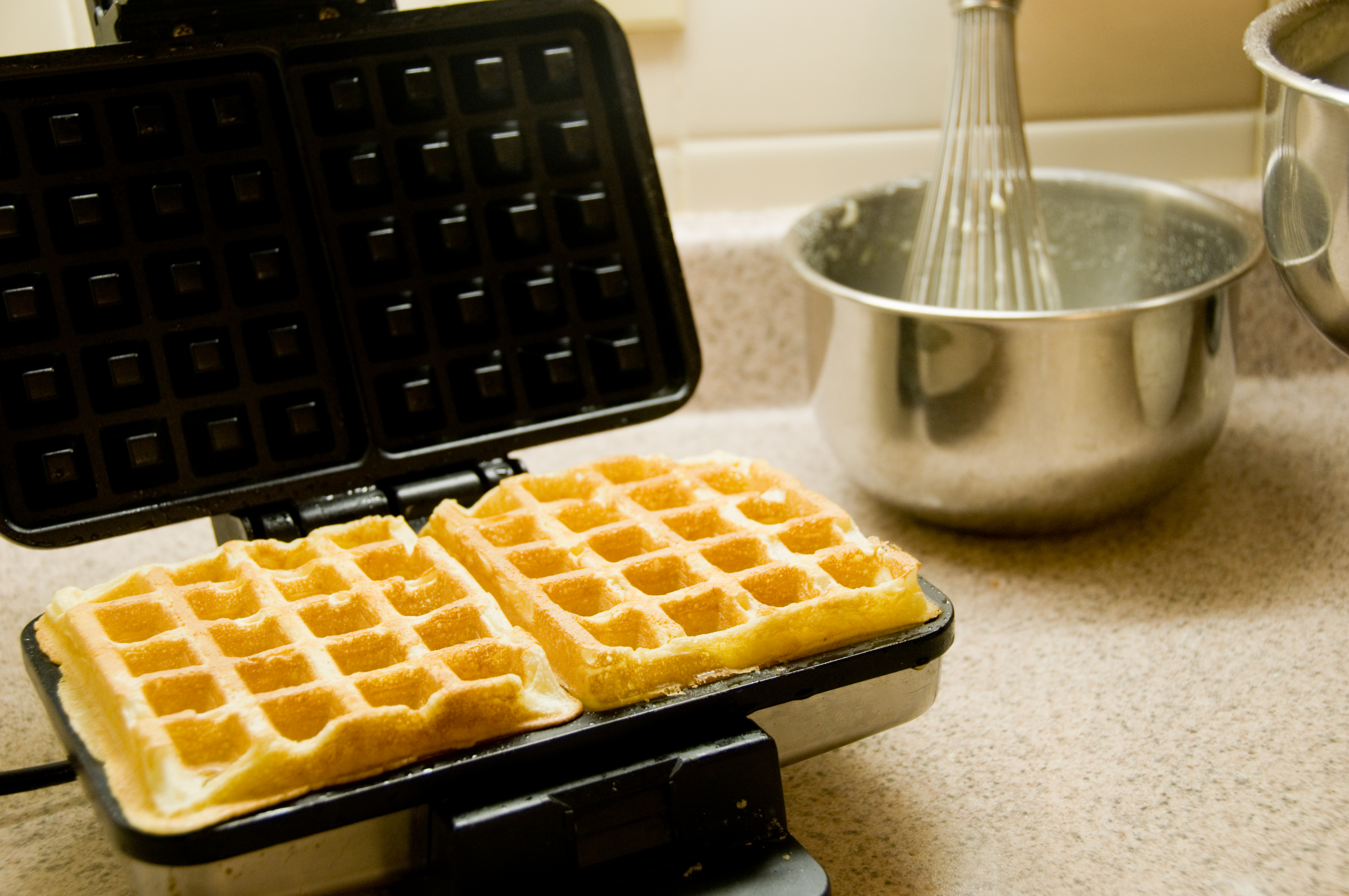
Waffles on a double-sided iron

Waffle-iron politics was a Belgian political strategy used in the past for determining the budget for projects in the country's two major regions, Flanders and Wallonia. Under this policy, for every franc spent on a project in Wallonia, a franc was also spent on a similar project in Flanders (and vice versa). The name is based on the idea that the waffle-iron always leaves an identical impression on both sides of waffles being baked.

The social and linguistic divisions between Flanders and Wallonia meant that the compromise of waffle-iron politics helped to maintain political peace. However, matching spending in one region with equal allocations to the other was costly and inefficient. Waffle-iron politics was a key cause of the Belgian national debt. In 1981, public debt amounted to 130% of GNP, among the highest in the European Community at the time.

Waffle-iron politics also led to the creation of several grote nutteloze bouwwerken (large useless construction works) that were misplaced or unnecessary public use. One example is the bridges in Varsenare, two bridges built in 1976 that were never connected to a highway.

Waffle-iron politics effectively came to an end in 1988 with the third state reform in Belgium. Belgium went from a unitary state to a federal one, giving each region more decision-making power. Flanders and Wallonia became responsible for their own spending, except in matters affecting the entire state.

== See also ==
- Politics of Belgium
