= Friendly =

Friendly may refer to:

== Places ==
- Friendly, West Yorkshire, England, a settlement
- Friendly, Maryland, United States, an unincorporated community and census-designated place
- Friendly, Eugene, Oregon, United States, a neighborhood
- Friendly, West Virginia, United States, a town
- Friendly Islands or Tonga

== People ==
- Friendly (surname)
- Friendly (musician), Australian-born musician Andrew Kornweibel (fl. 1998–?)

== Other uses ==
- Autism-friendly, being aware of social engagement and environmental factors affecting autistic people, with modifications to communication methods and physical space to better suit individuals' unique needs
- Bicycle-friendly, policies and practices help people feel more comfortable about traveling by bicycle with other traffic
- Friendly (sport), game of association football or bandy that has no consequence in a wider competition
- Friendly's, American restaurant chain
- Friendly Center, shopping mall in Greensboro, North Carolina, United States
- Friendly Hall, building on the University of Oregon campus
- Friendly High School, public high school in Fort Washington, Maryland, United States
- Henry J. Friendly Medal, awarded by the American Law Institute for contributions to the field of law
- Friendly TV, British TV station from 2003 to 2010
- "Friendly", song by J Hus from Common Sense (2017)
- "Friendly", song by Sakanaction from Adapt (2022)

== See also ==
- Henry the Friendly (1299–1327), son of King Albert I of Germany
- Friendly number, in mathematics, shares a property concerning its divisors
- Friend (disambiguation)
- Friendly Hills (disambiguation)
