= Friendly (surname) =

Jewish surname

Friendly is a surname, an American translated form of the German and Jewish surname Freundlich.

== Notable people ==
- Alfred Friendly (1911–1983), American journalist
- Andy Friendly (1951–2026), American television producer
- David T. Friendly (born 1956), American film producer
- Ed Friendly (1922–2007), American television producer
- Fred W. Friendly (1915–1998), President of CBS News
- Henry Friendly (1903–1986), American jurist and judge
- Michael Friendly (born 1945), American-Canadian psychologist

== See also ==
- Friendly (disambiguation)
- Freindlich
- Freundlich
