= Paul L. Davies =

British legal scholar

Paul Lyndon Davies KC (Hon), FBA (born 24 September 1944) is Allen & Overy Professor of Corporate Law Emeritus at the University of Oxford, Emeritus Fellow of Balliol College, Oxford, Emeritus Fellow of Jesus College, Oxford, and Emeritus Professor of Law at the London School of Economics, where he was the Cassel Professor of Commercial Law from 1998 to 2009. He is an honorary Bencher of Gray’s Inn.

== Career ==
Davies was a Fellow of Balliol College, Oxford and has held visiting positions at Yale and the University of Bordeaux, Paris, Bonn and a number of universities in South Africa.

Davies is a founder member and Fellow of the European Corporate Governance Institute. In 2000, Davies was elected a Fellow of the British Academy in 2000.

He is an expert in company law and labour law, having written numerous widely cited articles and some of its most respected and successful texts, including Gower and Davies Principles of Modern Company Law (9th edition, 2012).

Outside academic work Davies was a member of the Company Law Review Steering Group, whose reports eventually led to the Companies Act 2006; he is the general editor of the Industrial Law Journal and is Deputy Chairman of the Central Arbitration Committee. He was elected an honorary Queen's Counsel in 2006 and an honorary Bencher of Gray's Inn in 2007.

Davies holds degrees from the University of Oxford (BA Jurisprudence, 1966), the London School of Economics (LLM 1968) and Yale Law School (LLM 1969). He is married to the Iranian-born lawyer Saphieh Ashtiany, formerly a partner in the City law firm Nabarro LLP.

== Publications ==
Books

- The Anatomy of Corporate Law (2nd edn OUP 2009) (with Reinier Kraakman, John Armour, Luca Enriques, Henry Hansmann, Gérard Hertig, Klaus Hopt, Hideki Kanda, and Edward Rock)
- Towards a Flexible Labour Market (OUP 2007) (with Mark Freedland)
- Gower and Davies’ Principles of Modern Company Law (9th edn Sweet & Maxwell, London, 2012)
- Introduction to Company Law (Clarendon 2002 (1st ed) and 2010 (2nd ed))
- Labour Legislation and Public Policy (OUP 1993)

Articles

- 'The European Private Company (SPE): Uniformity, Flexibility, Competition and the Persistence of National Laws' (2010) EGCI Working Paper
- 'The Takeover Directive as a Protectionist Tool?' (2010) EGCI Working Paper (with EP Schuster and E Van de Walle de Ghelcke)
- 'Directors' Creditor-Regarding Duties in Respect of Trading Decisions Taken in the Vicinity of Insolvency' (2006) 7 European Business Organization Law Review 1
- 'Enron and corporate law reform in the UK and the European Community' in J Lowry and L Mistelis, (eds) Commercial law: perspectives and practice (LexisNexis Butterworths 2006)
- 'Workers on the Board of the European Company?' (2003) 32(2) Industrial Law Journal 75
- 'The Notion of Equality in European Take-Over Regulation' (2002) SSRN
- 'Shareholder Value: Company Law and Securities Markets Law - A British View' (2000) SSRN
- 'Board Structure in the UK and Germany: Convergence or Continuing Divergence?' (2001) SSRN
- 'Labour Markets, Welfare, and the Personal Scope of Employment Law' (2000) 16(1) Oxford Review of Economic Policy 84-94 (with Mark Freedland)
- 'The Board of Directors: Composition, Structure, Duties and Powers' (2000) Company Law Reform in OECD Countries '.pdf
- 'Employees, Workers and the Autonomy of Labour Law' (1999) SSRN (with Mark Freedland)
- 'A Note on Labour and Corporate Governance in the United Kingdom' in KJ Hopt et al. (eds), Comparative Corporate Governance (Clarendon 1998)
- 'The Relationship Between the European Court of Justice and the British Courts over the Interpretation of Directive 77/187/EC' (1997) European University Institute
- 'Institutional Investors in the United Kingdom', in T Baums, RM Buxbaum & KJ Hopt (eds) Institutional Investors and Corporate Governance (1994) 257
- 'Representation of Workers in the United Kingdom from Collective Laissez-Faire to Market Individualism' (1993–1994) 15 Comparative Labor Law Journal 167
- 'Institutional Investors: A U.K. View' (1991) 57 Brooklyn Law Review 129
- Davies (1978). "The Bullock Report and Employee Participation in Corporate Planning in the UK" (PDF). Journal of Comparative Corporate Law and Securities Regulation. 1 (3): 245. Archived from the original (PDF) on 16 June 2011.
- 'The Land of Industrial Democracy' (1977) 6 Industrial Law Journal 197 (with Lord Wedderburn)

== See also ==
- UK company law
