= Dainard =

Dainard is the name of:

- Dainard Paulson (born 1937), American footballer
- Derek Dainard (born 1997), Micronesian swimmer

== See also ==
- Richard Daynard, American legal scholar
