= Stephen Barnett =

American lawyer (1935–2009)

- Born: December 25, 1935; Brooklyn, New York, U.S.
- Died: October 13, 2009 (aged 73); Oakland, California, U.S.
- Education: Harvard University (AB, LLB)
- Occupations: law professor and legal scholar
- Spouse: Karine Barnett

Stephen Roger Barnett (December 25, 1935 – October 13, 2009) was an American law professor and legal scholar who campaigned against the Newspaper Preservation Act of 1970 and the effects its antitrust exemptions had on newspaper consolidation. He also criticized the California Supreme Court for practices that hid information from the public.

== Biography ==
Barnett was born on December 25, 1935, in the Brooklyn borough of New York City. He grew up in West Hartford, Connecticut, and attended Loomis Chaffee School. He attended Harvard University on a scholarship, earning his undergraduate degree in 1957. He served as president of The Harvard Crimson. At Harvard Law School Barnett served as note editor of the Harvard Law Review; he was awarded his law degree in 1962. Following his graduation, he clerked for United States Court of Appeals for the Second Circuit Judge Henry J. Friendly and then for Justice William J. Brennan of the Supreme Court of the United States. After a few years at the law firm of Cleary Gottlieb Steen & Hamilton, he was hired by Berkeley Law School, where he spent almost the entirety of his career until his retirement in 2003. The exception was a stint as an assistant solicitor general in the United States Department of Justice, where Barnett argued cases before the Supreme Court from 1977 until 1979.

A leading critic of the Newspaper Preservation Act of 1970, which was intended to allow multiple newspapers in the same city to survive by forming joint operating agreements to share revenues and cut costs, argued that the unintended consequence of the legislation was the consolidation and development of large nationwide newspaper chains. These agreements often resulted in the demise of the weaker paper once the agreement was ended.

In his article The Dog That Did Not Bark, Barnett was critical of a practice called "depublication", under which the California Supreme Court can at its choice, or if requested, order that a decision by the California Court of Appeals be excluded from publication, which means that it becomes impossible to cite the decision in later legal actions, making the court less open and accountable. His criticism of the Commission on Judicial Performance in California led to a 1999 decision requiring it to disclose how each member voted in actions it takes.

Barnett died at age 73 died on October 13, 2009, in Oakland, California, of cardiac arrest. He was survived by his wife, Karine, as well as by a son, Alexander Barnett, and a stepson, Levon Barnett.

== See also ==
- List of law clerks for the third seat of the Supreme Court of the United States
