= David Seipp =

American scholar

David John Seipp (born October 19, 1955) is an American legal scholar. He is Professor of Law Emeritus at Boston University, where he taught from 1986 to 2024. Seipp served as director of the American Society for Legal History and serves as trustee of the Ames Foundation.

== Early life and education ==
Seipp was born on October 19, 1955, in Dubuque, Iowa. Seipp is the son of Norbert H. Seipp, a native of Dubuque. He entered Harvard College in 1973, graduating in 1977 with a Bachelor of Arts in history, summa cum laude, with membership in Phi Beta Kappa as a Presidential Scholar. In 1979, he received a second B.A. from Merton College, Oxford, in jurisprudence, then a Bachelor of Laws from St John's College, Cambridge, in 1980. He returned to the United States in 1980 to attend Harvard Law School, where he entered with advanced standing as a second-year student. He graduated magna cum laude in 1982 and was an editor of the Harvard Law Review.

== Career ==
From 1982 to 1983, Seipp was a law clerk to Judge Henry Friendly of the United States Court of Appeals for the Second Circuit. He was in private practice afterward at Foley Hoag as an associate attorney, practicing appellate litigation, intellectual property, government contracting, administrative law, and disability rights. He left in 1986 to become a professor at the Boston University School of Law.

Seipp has compiled a database of 22,318 records that index and paraphrase printed law reports of England's central royal courts between 1268 and 1535, known as the Year Books.

Seipp is a life member of the American Law Institute.

== Personal life ==
Seipp married Carol Frances Lee, general counsel of the Export–Import Bank of the United States, on September 10, 1994. Judge Patricia Wald officiated the marriage.
