= Todd Rakoff =

American legal scholar (born 1946)

Todd D. Rakoff (born 1946) is an American legal scholar. He is the Byrne Professor of Administrative Law at Harvard Law School.

== Education and career ==
Rakoff is the brother of Jed S. Rakoff, a judge of the United States District Court for the Southern District of New York. He graduated from Harvard College in 1967 with a B.A. in social studies. He received a Bachelor of Philosophy (B.Phil.) from Oxford University in 1969 then a M.S.Ed. in urban education from the University of Pennsylvania in 1971. In 1975, Rakoff graduated from Harvard Law School. After clerking for Judge Henry Friendly of the United States Court of Appeals for the Second Circuit and practicing for the law firm of Foley Hoag, he joined the faculty of Harvard Law School in 1979.
