= Candler Oak Tree =

Old oak tree in Savannah, Georgia, US

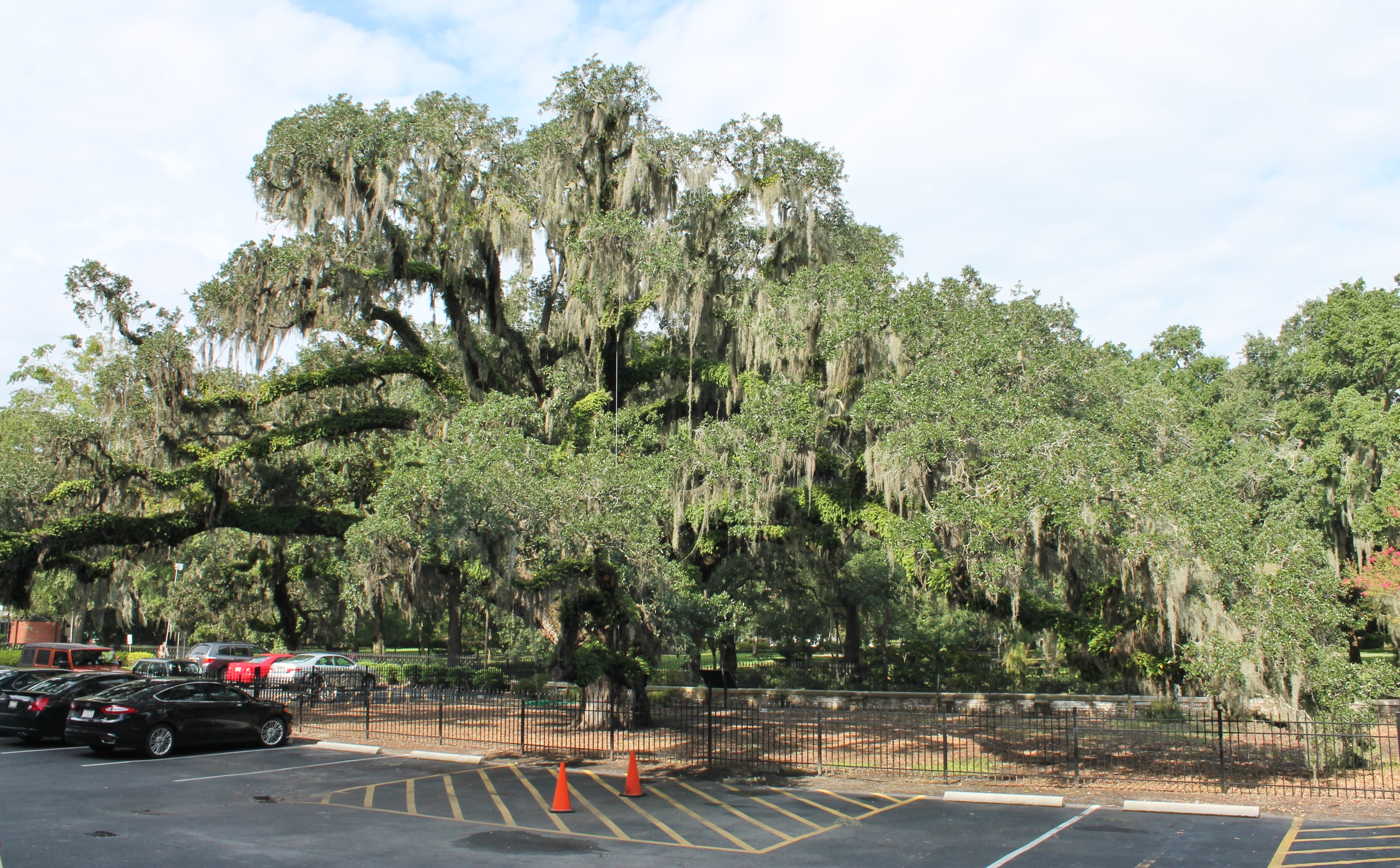
- Candler Oak Tree

- Location within Georgia
- Species: Southern live oak (Quercus virginiana)
- Location: Savannah, Georgia, U.S.
- Coordinates: 32.0676°N 81.0963°W

The Candler Oak Tree is located in Savannah, Georgia, United States, and is estimated to have been growing since the 1700s, making it one of the oldest living landmarks in the area. It is 54 feet (16.5 meters) tall, has a circumference of 17 ft (5.2 m) and a 63-inch (160 cm) diameter. Its average crown spread is 110 ft (34 m).

The largest tree in Georgia is located on Drayton Street between Gaston Street and Huntington Street in Savannah, Georgia. This southern live oak has a diameter of 10 ft (3 m) and is estimated to be 350–450 years old.

== Location ==
The Candler Oak Tree is located on the property of Savannah College of Art and Design at Deloitte Foundry, 516 Drayton Street, Savannah, Georgia. The tree is located adjacent to Forsyth Park.

== History ==
In 1984, the Savannah Tree Foundation secured the nation's first conservation easement on a single tree and a 6,804-foot (2,074 m) easement was established to protect the Candler Oak from loss to development. In 2001, the Georgia Urban Forest Council designated the tree as a Georgia Landmark and Historic Tree. In 2012, Savannah Law School purchased the historic property on which the Candler Oak resides. The law school tried to take measures to protect the tree by putting up fences, reserving space for the tree's lowest branches, and placed the tree under security surveillance. The tree also served as the law school's logo. The law school closed and is now owned by Savannah College of Art and Design.

== Gallery ==
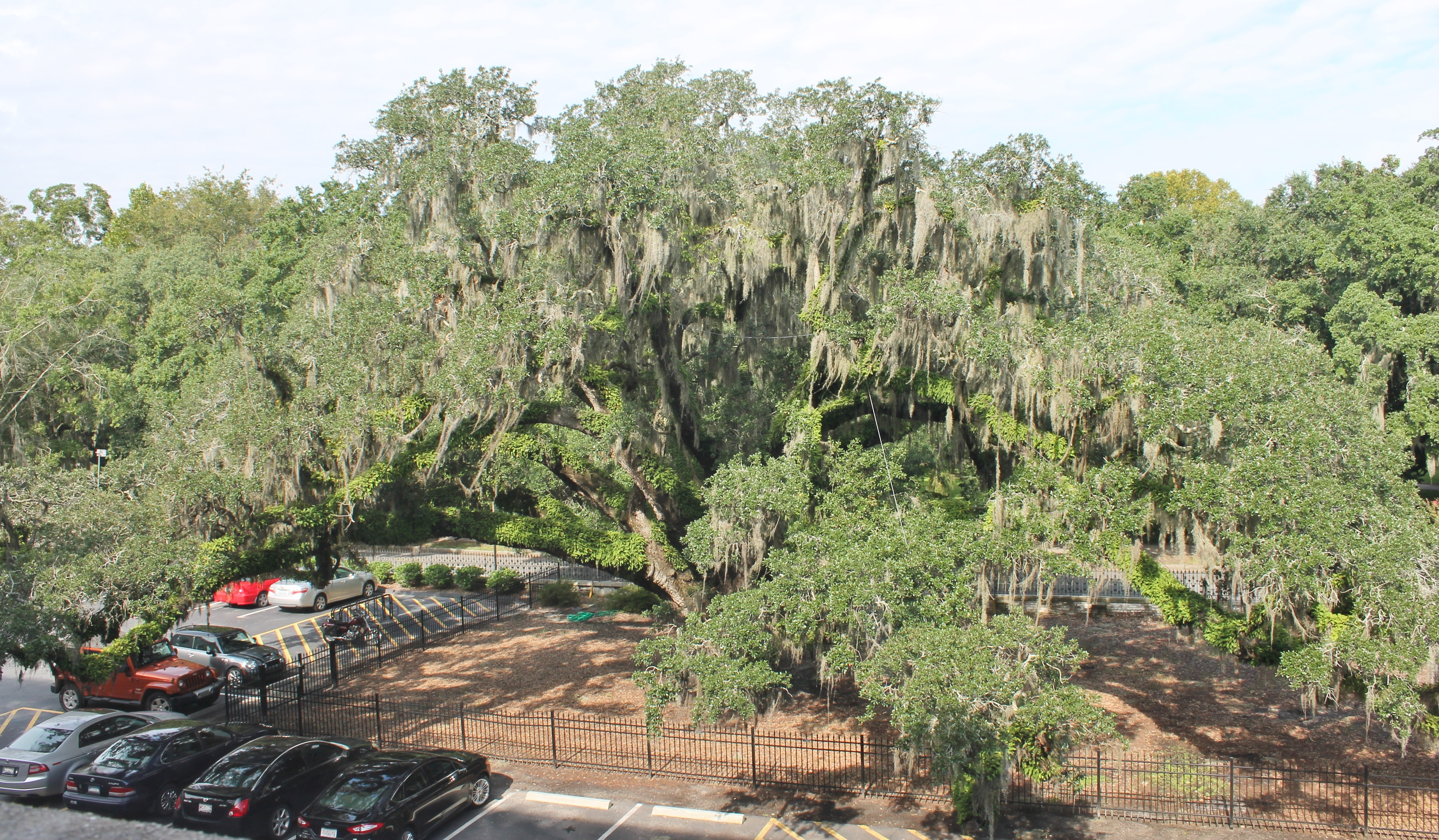
Candler Oak Tree, aerial view

== See also ==
- List of individual trees
