= Frederick T. Davis =

American legal scholar

Frederick Townsend Davis (born 1946) is an American legal scholar. He is a lecturer at Columbia Law School.

== Education and career ==
Davis attended Harvard University, graduating cum laude from Harvard College in 1967, then enrolled in Columbia Law School, where he was an editor of the Columbia Law Review and earned a Juris Doctor (J.D.) in 1972 as a James Kent Scholar. After law school, he served as a law clerk to Chief Judge Henry Friendly of the United States Court of Appeals for the Second Circuit in 1972–1973, then clerked for Justice Potter Stewart of the U.S. Supreme Court.

From 1974 to 1978, Davis was an assistant U.S. attorney in the Southern District of New York and also served as its chief appellate attorney. He is a member of the New York bar and the bar of Paris, France.

== Awards and honors ==
Davis is an elected life member of the American Law Institute. In 2002, he was made a Chevalier of the Ordre national du Mérite for "work representing French interests". In 2023, he was named a chevalier of the Legion of Honor of France, the country's highest civilian honor.
