= Savannah Law School =

Private law school in Georgia, U.S.

Coordinates: 32°4′9.06″N 81°5′37.61″W

- Parent school: Atlanta's John Marshall Law School
- Established: 2011; ceased operations in 2021
- School type: Private, for-profit law school
- Dean: Malcolm L. Morris
- Enrollment: 147
- Bar pass rate: 40.0% (Oct 2020 first-time takers)
- Website: www.savannahlawschool.org

Savannah Law School was a private, for-profit law school in Savannah, Georgia. It was associated with Atlanta's John Marshall Law School. The school ceased all operations by 2021.

== Campus ==
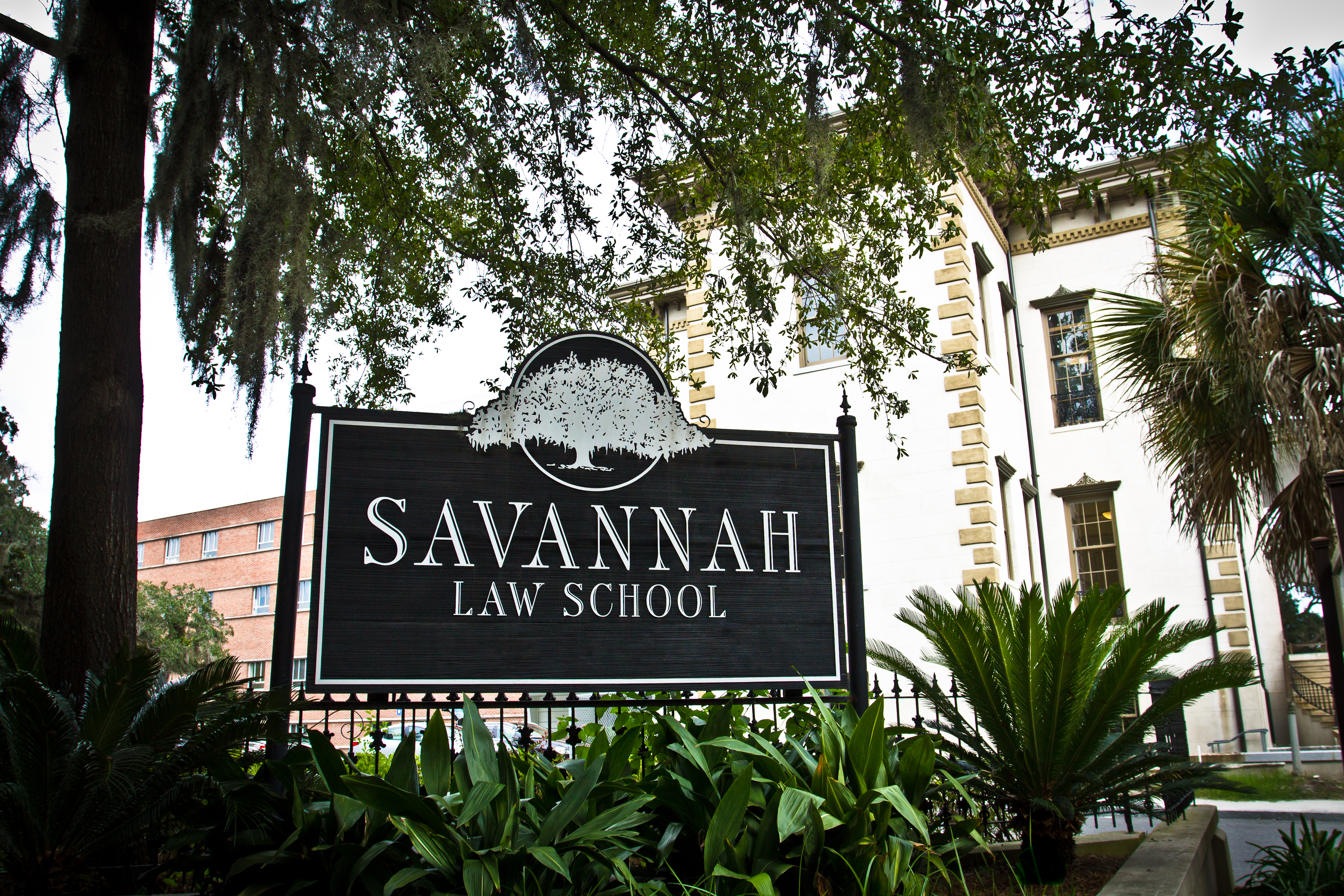
Savannah Law School

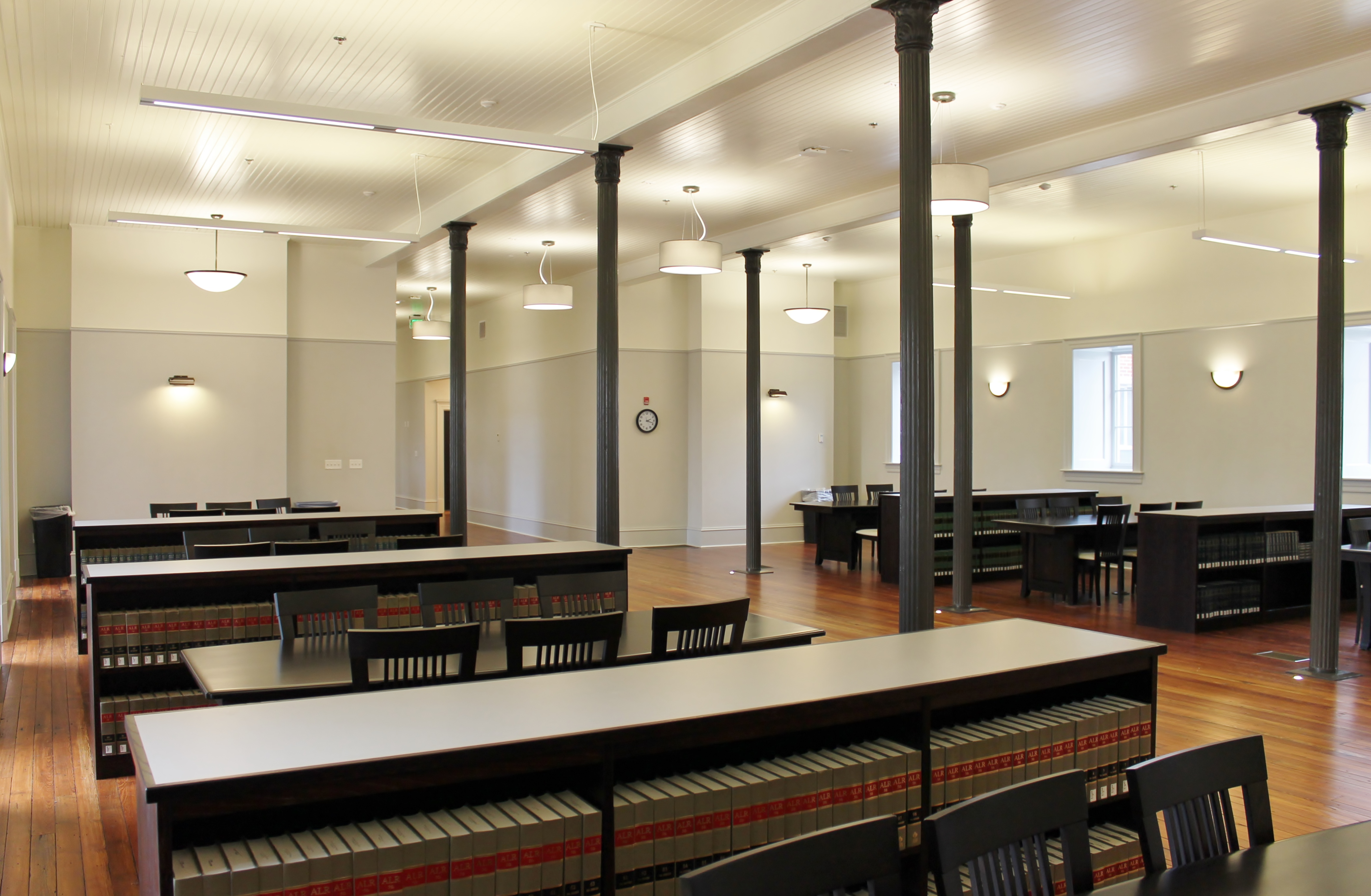
Savannah Law School Law Library

Savannah Law School began in the historic former Warren A. Candler Hospital building on Forsyth Park in downtown Savannah. Constructed in 1819 among 26 Seaman's hospitals chartered by an Act of Congress in 1791, the building is the oldest hospital in the state of Georgia, and was used as such until 1980. The building served as both a Confederate and Union hospital during the Civil War. Several tenants occupied the building sporadically from 1980 until 2009.

In 2012, the Historic Preservation Board approved Savannah Law School's comprehensive restoration of the 110,000 square foot facility. The renovations met federal historic preservation standards and were completed in 2014. The project represents one of the largest efforts to restore an historic property in the United States. In 2015, The Victorian Society in America and the Savannah Historic Preservation Board honored Savannah Law School with Preservation Awards for the renovation. The building was sold to Savannah College of Art and Design in 2018 and precipitated the shutdown of the law school.

The Candler Oak Tree is located on the campus. In 2004, it was placed on the National Register of Historic Trees. At approximately 300 years of age, it is thought to be one of the oldest living landmarks in the region. The Savannah Tree Foundation holds a conservation easement to the tree and helps care for the tree along with the law school. The law school adopted the tree as its logo.

== Statistics ==
Savannah Law School had an 8-to-1 student-to-faculty ratio. The median LSAT score of the entire 1L class was 151; however, the median score of the full-time program was 153 and that of the part-time program was 149. 21% of the 2014 entering class were minorities, 17% were military veterans, 71% women, and 64% from out-of-state.

== Savannah Law Review ==
The Savannah Law Review was a law review published by Savannah Law School students twice a year. It was a member of the National Conference of Law Reviews. It published nationally and internationally respected scholars and local practitioners.

Along with the publication, it annual colloquium brought national attention to the Savannah Law School. The annual themes were as follows:

- September 2014 - (Re)Integrating Spaces to celebrate the historic renovations at the law school. The colloquium featured national scholars and local practitioners.
- September 2015 - The Walking Dead, which surveyed academic topics regarding how death and fear of death affect the law of the living.
- 2016 - American Legal Fictions, exploring the role of legal fictions in shaping the law.
- 2017 - Rise of the Automatons, exploring the legal implications of automation in society.

== Student organizations ==
A number of student organizations were active at Savannah Law School. Student groups included American Association for Justice, American Constitution Society, Environmental Law Society, Federalist Society, Law Students of the Lowcountry, Maritime Law Society, Mock Trial, Moot Court Honor Board, National Black Law Students Association, National Women Law Students' Organization, OfFitness Intermeddlers, OUTLaws & Allies, Phi Alpha Delta - Telfair Chapter, Savannah Law Veterans Association, Student Bar Association, and The Tunnel: Law and Humanities Society.

== Relationship to AJMLS ==
The law school was first opened by Atlanta's John Marshall Law School in the 1970s, but the campus was discontinued in the 1980s. The American Bar Association approved the law school's re-establishment as a branch of AJMLS on December 5, 2011, and the class of 2015 enrolled in August 2012. The American Bar Association defines a branch as "the creation of a different law school."

== See also ==
- List of defunct law schools in the United States
