= Friendly Hills =

Friendly Hills may refer to:

- Friendly Hills, Whittier, California, in Los Angeles County
- Friendly Hills, San Bernardino County, California, a place in California
- Friendly Hills (Tryon, North Carolina), a historic estate listed on the NRHP
