= Reinier Kraakman =

American legal scholar

Reinier Herman Kraakman (born June 15, 1949) is an American legal scholar and sociologist. He is the Ezra Ripley Thayer Professor of Law at Harvard Law School.

== Education and career ==
Kraakman graduated from Harvard College in 1971 with a Bachelor of Arts (B.A.) in history and science. He was awarded a Fulbright Scholarship to study at Goethe University Frankfurt. He then earned his Ph.D. from Harvard University in sociology in 1973 and his Juris Doctor (J.D.) from Yale Law School in 1979.

Kraakman clerked for Judge Henry Friendly of the United States Court of Appeals for the Second Circuit. He was previously a professor at Yale, Georgetown, and New York University.
