= Freindlich =

Freindlich is a surname which is a variant of the German surname Freundlich. Notable people with the surname include:

- Alisa Freindlich (born 1934), Soviet and Russian actress
- Bruno Freindlich (1909–2002), Soviet/Russian actor of German ancestry

== See also ==
- Freundlich
