= Richard Daynard =

American legal scholar (born 1944)

- Born: 1944 (age 81–82); United States
- Education: Columbia University (BA, MA); Harvard University (JD); Massachusetts Institute of Technology (PhD)
- Occupations: Law professor; public health professional; author

Academic work
- Discipline: Public health Social policy
- Institutions: Columbia University; Northeastern University

Richard A. Daynard (born 1944) is an American legal scholar. He is a University Distinguished Professor at the Northeastern University School of Law.

Daynard is most known for his contributions to public health law and strategic litigation, especially against the tobacco industry. His work is focused in health law and policy, consumer protection, and public interest advocacy. He is the recipient of the 2019 Robert Morris Sr. Award for Courage in Litigation from the Massachusetts chapter of the American Board of Trial Advocates.

== Education ==
Daynard graduated from the Bronx High School of Science. He then graduated summa cum laude from Columbia University with a bachelor's degree in philosophy in 1964, and was elected to Phi Beta Kappa. He received the university's Siff Award in the Philosophy of Science. He then attended Harvard Law School, graduating with a Juris Doctor (J.D.), cum laude, in 1967. As a law student, he was a member of the Harvard Legal Aid Bureau. Daynard was a law clerk for Judge Henry J. Friendly of the United States Court of Appeals for the Second Circuit from 1967 to 1968.

In 1970, Daynard received a Masters in Arts (M.A.) in sociology from Columbia University. In 1980, he completed a Ph.D. in urban studies and planning from the Massachusetts Institute of Technology.

== Career ==
Daynard began his academic career as an Associate in Law Teaching Fellow at Columbia Law School in New York City from September 1968 to June 1969. He then moved on to become an assistant professor of law at Northeastern University School of Law, from 1969 to 1972. He was later promoted to Associate Professor of Law from 1972 to 1973 and then to professor of law from 1973 to 2012. In 2012, he was honored as a University Distinguished Professor, a title he holds to this day.

Daynard has served as President of the Public Health Advocacy Institute (and its predecessors) since 1983, and has chaired its Tobacco Product Liability Project since its inception in 1984.

== Research and advocacy ==
Daynard is known for his contribution to establishing the legal liability of the tobacco industry for the adverse health consequences, including disease, disability, and death caused by tobacco use. His efforts to develop counter strategies and tactics against the tobacco industry have been widely recognized and discussed in books, including The Cigarette Century, Ashes to Ashes, Cornered: Big Tobacco at the Bar of Justice, Smokescreen: The Truth Behind the Tobacco Industry's Cover-up, The People vs. Big Tobacco, and Civil Warriors, and was featured in a New York Times article, Using Liability Law to Put Tobacco on Trial: Anti-smoking Crusader. He has authored over 100 publications spanning the areas of public interest advocacy, civil liability, and consumer protection, including articles in peer-reviewed journals and book chapters. He has also lectured on tobacco control issues in 54 countries.

=== Tobacco industry tactics ===
Daynard's research on the tobacco industry explores the role that attorneys for tobacco companies have played in affecting corporate behavior regarding the health impacts of tobacco products. His research on the tobacco industry's use of Personal Responsibility Rhetoric revealed its strategic employment of language to shape public opinion and policy, emphasizing the importance of understanding these tactics to combat them and hold the industry accountable for promoting harmful products. Further studies highlighted the industry's efforts to delay smoking regulations, influence decision-makers, and use pre-emption strategies and front groups to limit local government power and create confusion among the public. He has also examined the impact of tobacco use on health disparities and researched the strategies used by the tobacco industry to influence public opinion. Focusing on the regulation of menthol cigarettes, he uncovered the tactics employed by the tobacco industry to secure the endorsement of civil rights groups for their argument in favor of making menthol available.

=== Tobacco control and litigation ===
Through his analysis of the role litigation plays in tobacco control, Daynard revealed the adversarial nature of the process, the challenges for scientific experts, and the evolution of tobacco litigation in the US, emphasizing the significant impact of state litigation in enhancing industry transparency and empowering the tobacco control movement as well as contributing evidence to strengthen the legal basis for action. In related research, he discussed the significant financial compensation exacted from tobacco companies to reimburse healthcare costs and finance tobacco control efforts, putting the industry on the political defensive, and providing insights into legal strategies and challenges. While examining the successful strategies employed globally to reduce tobacco use and exposure to tobacco advertising, his work provided recommendations for policymakers and advocates and emphasized the importance of reducing or eliminating tobacco advertising as a key element of effective tobacco control efforts. His International work has sought to extend understanding of human rights to include tobacco prevention and control by convening workshops and symposia in over 20 countries.

=== Food policy ===
Daynard's early research highlighted the effectiveness of the Framework Convention on Tobacco Control (FCTC) and proposed the adoption of comparable policies and mechanisms to improve nutrition by placing restrictions on advertising and promotions for unhealthy foods, implementing price and tax measures, and clear labeling on food products. In his examination of using litigation as a means to prevent obesity, his study stressed its potential in protecting public health in the absence of effective government regulation, and suggested employing legal theories such as "unfair and deceptive trade practice" or general "personal injury" claims, and argued that successful personal injury cases could incentivize food producers to compensate victims and curtail aggressive marketing tactics while promoting safer product development. His analysis of the "Commonsense Consumption Acts" (CCAs) emphasized the necessity for policymakers to examine the broader ramifications of CCAs beyond obesity-related tort reform and highlighted that CCAs curtail the jurisdiction of state attorney generals to pursue consumer protection claims against the food industry. Additionally, the study refuted the assertions made by supporters of CCAs that these laws safeguard against frivolous litigation, noting that each state with a CCA had existing legal protections in place.

=== Sports Betting ===
The Public Health Advocacy Institute, of which Daynard is the president, filed a class action lawsuit on behalf of Massachusetts citizens who opened DraftKings Sportsbook accounts in response to a $1,000 bonus sign-up promotion. Members were not aware to qualify for the non-withdrawable credits of $1,000, new customers were required to make an initial deposit of $5,000 and gamble at least $25,000 over a finite period. Daynard stated "Online gambling is creating a public health disaster with increasingly addictive products right before our eyes... Massive advertising using unfair and deceptive promotions to hook customers on an addictive product bears an uncanny similarity to what the cigarette companies used to get away with.”

== Awards and honors ==
- 1991 – Smoking or Health Award, American Lung Association of Massachusetts
- 1998 – Certificate of Special Recognition, The Gleitsman Foundation
- 1999 – Champion of Justice Award, Middlesex County Bar Association
- 2005 – Dr. William Cahan Distinguished Professor Award
- 2019 – Robert Morris Sr. Award for Courage in Litigation, American Board of Trial Advocates – Massachusetts Chapter
- 2022 – Pioneer Award, Northeastern University

== Selected articles ==
- Daynard, R.A. (1988) Tobacco Liability Litigation as a Cancer Control Strategy. JNCI: Journal of the National Cancer Institute, Volume 80, Issue 1, March 2, 1988, Pages 9–13
- Daynard, R.A. (1996) The Physician's Role in Helping Smoke-Sensitive Patients to Use the Americans With Disabilities Act to Secure Smoke-Free Workplaces and Public Spaces, J. American Med. Assoc. 1996;276(11):909–913.
- Daynard, R. A. (2012). How smoking became history: looking back to 2012. Tobacco Control, 21(2), 289–290.
- Daynard, Richard A. (2013), Stubbing Out Cigarettes for Good. New York Times March 4, 2013, p. A21.
- Daynard, R. (2013). Regulatory approaches to ending cigarette-caused death and disease in the United States. American Journal of Law & Medicine, 39(2–3), 290–297.
- Martínez-Sánchez, J. M., Ballbè, M., Fu, M., Martín-Sánchez, J. C., Gottlieb, M., Saltó, E., ... & Fernández, E. (2014). Attitudes towards electronic cigarettes regulation in indoor workplaces and selected public and private places: a population-based cross-sectional study. PLoS one, 9(12), e114256.
- Daynard R.A. (2012) Allying tobacco control with human rights: invited commentary Tobacco Control 2012;21:213–214.
- Friedman, L., Cheyne, A., Givelber, D., Gottlieb, M., & Daynard, R. A. (2015). Tobacco Industry Use of Personal Responsibility in Public Relations and Litigation: Disguising Freedom to Blame as Freedom of Choice. American Journal of Public Health, 105(2).
- Gottlieb, M. A., Daynard, R. A., & Friedman, L. C. (2021). Casinos: An Addiction Industry in the Mold of Tobacco and Opioid Drugs. U. Ill. Law. Rev., 1711.
