= Freundlich =

German surname

Freundlich is a surname of German and Jewish origin.

== Notable people ==
- Bart Freundlich (born 1970), American film producer
- Elisabeth Freundlich (1906–2001), Austrian Jewish playwright, poet, and journalist
- Emmy Freundlich (1878–1948), Austrian writer and politician
- Erwin Finlay-Freundlich (1885–1964), German astronomer
- Herbert Freundlich (1880–1941), German chemist
- Irwin Freundlich (1908–1977), American music teacher and academician
- Jeff Freundlich, American musician
- Jeffry P. Freundlich (born 1952), American author writing under the pen name Jeff Lindsay
- Leo Freundlich (1875–1953), Austrian–Czech journalist and politician
- Mads Freundlich (born 2003), Danish footballer
- Otto Freundlich (1878–1943), German painter
- Raphael E. Freundlich (1928–2012), German-born Israeli classical scholar, humanist and Latinist

== See also ==
- Freindlich
- Friendly (surname)
