= Savannah Law Review =

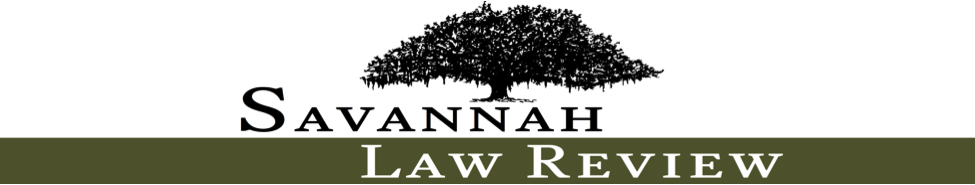
Logo

The Savannah Law Review was a scholarly law review journal focusing on current legal issues.

== Description ==
Savannah Law Review conformed all citations to The Bluebook: A Uniform System of Citation. For grammatical and style issues not addressed by The Bluebook, the Chicago Manual of Style controlled.

Savannah Law Review's publication was set in Equity font, a typeface by Matthew Butterick. The journal was printed by Western Publishing, 537 East Ohio Street, Indianapolis, IN 46204.

Cite to Savannah Law Review as Savannah L. Rev.

== History ==
The Savannah Law Review began in 2013 and was a student-run law review publication at Savannah Law School. 2016 marks the law review's third volume. It ceased publication in 2021, when the Savannah Law School closed.

== Membership selection ==
Using a competitive process that took into account grades and performance on a writing exercise, the Savannah Law Review offered membership to student legal scholars at Savannah Law School.

== Colloquia ==
Each year, the Savannah Law Review held a colloquium at Savannah Law School which focused on pressing legal issues. The colloquium consisted of a keynote address by a leader in the field, and panels discussing new aspects of symposium's topic. These included:

- 2016 – American Legal Fictions
- 2015 – The Walking Dead
- 2014 – [Re]Integrating Spaces
