= Thomas Reed Powell =

American legal scholar (1880–1955)

- Born: April 29, 1880; Richford, Vermont
- Died: August 16, 1955 (aged 75)
- Spouse: Mary Lee Hale (m. 1915)
- Children: Three

Academic background
- Education: University of Vermont

Academic work
- Discipline: Constitutional law
- Institutions: Harvard Law School

Thomas Reed Powell (April 29, 1880 – August 16, 1955) was an American legal scholar and political scientist who taught at Harvard Law School for twenty-five years. He was educated at the University of Vermont, Harvard Law School, and Columbia University. He was a professor at Harvard Law School from 1925 until retiring in 1949, at which point he became an emeritus professor there. He subsequently taught at Suffolk University from 1950 to 1955. He was elected to the American Academy of Arts & Sciences in 1931 and served as president of the American Political Science Association in 1937. After his death in 1955, obituaries were published for him in the Harvard Law Review, authored by Erwin N. Griswold, Felix Frankfurter, Paul A. Freund, and Henry M. Hart, Jr.
