= The Other Invisible Hand =

Book by Julian Le Grand

The Other Invisible Hand: Delivering Public Services through Choice and Competition
- Author: Julian Le Grand
- Genre: Nonfiction
- Publisher: Princeton University Press
- Publication date: 2007
- Pages: 208
- ISBN: 0-69-112936-3

The Other Invisible Hand is a non-fiction book written by the economist Julian Le Grand. The primary focus of his book is increasing taxpayer sovereignty by developing a market in the public sector.

The title of the book refers to Adam Smith's invisible hand. The invisible hand is the idea that individual choice benefits society more than does a government which assumes that it "can arrange the different members of a great society with as much ease as the hand arranges the different pieces upon a chess-board."

== Overview ==
Le Grand begins his book by suggesting that there are four models concerning the provision of public goods: trusting professionals, command and control, voice mechanisms and choice. Out of the four, "choice" is the best way to ensure the optimal provision of quality public services. This is because choice, in theory, "creates incentives for providers to deliver what users want". The key focus is on how to make choice work better. This includes "ensuring that there is genuine competition, allowing entry and exit of schools and hospitals, enabling individuals to make informed choices and preventing cream-skimming of pupils and patients."

In his conclusion, Le Grand recognizes that his arguments "have not, as yet, been embraced either by the social democratic left, or by the conservative or liberal right." Yet he continues to hope that "both political groupings will come to recognize that this is the optimal way to provide high quality, responsive, efficient and equitable services."

== Criticism ==
Criticisms include that the book does not address the cost of implementation, it inadequately addresses the issue of consumer information and it does not offer sufficient evidence to support the conclusion.

== See also ==
- Consumer sovereignty
- Motivation, Agency, and Public Policy
- Scroogenomics
- Exit, Voice, and Loyalty
