= Motivation, Agency, and Public Policy =

Motivation, Agency and Public Policy: Of Knights and Knaves, Pawns and Queens
- Author: Julian Le Grand
- Language: English
- Genre: Nonfiction
- Publisher: Oxford University Press
- Publication date: 2003
- Publication place: US
- Pages: 208
- ISBN: 0-19-926699-9
- OCLC: 52193481

Motivation, Agency, and Public Policy is a non-fiction book written by the economist Julian Le Grand. The book, which argues in favor of increasing tax choice, was described by The Economist as "accessible – and profound" and by The Times as "one of the most stimulating books on public policy in recent years".

== Overview ==
In his book, Le Grand explores ways of increasing the amount of choice and competition in the public sector. This quasi-market would transform citizens from pawns to queens and "improve quality and value for money". Specific policy recommendations include "demogrants" and hypothecation (earmarking).

== Criticism ==
One criticism is that Le Grand's argument only has limited appeal. "Le Grand’s argument does not speak to libertarians; rejecting the welfare state, they part from him long before he calls on them to cheer for transforming service users into queens. Nor does his argument entice liberal egalitarians."

== See also ==
- Scroogenomics
- The Other Invisible Hand
