= Eissa =

Eissa or Al-Eissa is a given name and surname. Notable people with the name include:

== Surname ==
- Hamad Al-Eissa (born 1982), Saudi Arabian football player
- Ibrahim Eissa (born 1965), Egyptian journalist and TV personality
- Mohamed Eissa (born 1936), Egyptian rower
- Muhammad S. Eissa, American Arabist
- Nada Eissa, American economist
- Omar Eissa (born 1996), Egyptian swimmer
- Osama Al-Eissa (born 1963), Palestinian writer
- Seif Eissa (born 1998), Egyptian taekwondo practitioner
- Yaa'rab al-Eissa, Syrian writer and journalist

== Given name ==
- Eissa Meer Abdulrahman (born 1967), Emirati footballer
