= Quasi-market =

Type of exchange system

Quasi-markets are markets which can be supervised and organisationally designed that are intended to create greater desire and more efficiency in comparison to conventional delivery systems, while supporting more accessibility, stability and impartiality than traditional markets. Quasi-markets also can be referred to as internal or planned markets.

A market is a form of exchange mechanism of goods and services that is used to align supply and demand commonly by using the act of price adjusting. As such, a market also can be considered a self-adjusting financial incentive device that impacts the behaviour of each producer and purchaser so that both parties agree on the terms of an exchange. Quasi-markets are also an exchange system; they aim to comply with the characteristics of competitive markets by attempting to be self-correcting, inducement structures that impact purchasers and producers' behaviours. Quasi-markets differ, however, by possessing characteristics and aspects at both the supply and demand stages that are not shared in traditional markets.

Outsourcing in the public sector creates so-called Quasi-markets for services that are primarily funded by taxes. The phrase Quasi-market emphasises the distinction between markets for tax-financed services and typical markets, specifically that the consumed services are paid for by a third party—the government. The existence of political aims that would not be met in a free market is the normative rationale for the government to pay. Most democratic countries place a premium on equal access to education and healthcare. Paternalism is also present; resource redistribution is conditional on the consumption of some services having a 'public' component. The government frequently provides finance to a large number of vendors, who then compete to provide the service in a quasi-market. By forcing suppliers to compete for customers and funding, this competition is intended to promote efficiency and quality.

In the context of the supply, Quasi-markets are a market system, due to each producer competing to draw the maximum amount of consumers whilst competing with other producers. In the public sector, producers are often non-government companies (NGO's). Producers can also be segments or sectors of a specific firm that internally exchange their services inside a certain form of quasi-marketplace'; this is known as an internal market. it is important to acknowledge that internal markets are not open markets, this is because manufacturers with their goods and services will normally need third-party consumer permissions to enter a market.

In terms of demand,"Quasi-markets are structured to create and enhance consumer benefits and advantages, requiring producers to be responsive to the given alternatives. Inside the private sector's inner markets, pricing has a direct effect on internal resource allocation, although it does not directly have an impact on a firm's bottom line.

The implementation of a Quasi-market suggests that each purchaser and producer are separate entities and that there are multiple producers. This process in which some companies are given consumer status and the exclusive perks that come alongside such status and where the firms are given consumer status and fewer limitations and boundaries, and encouragement of self-governance is referred to as a purchaser-provider split.

== Example ==
A notable example would be the NHS Internal Market introduced by the National Health Service and Community Care Act 1990: under this system, the purchase and provision of healthcare in the UK was split up, with government-funded GP fundholders "purchasing" healthcare from NHS trusts and district health authorities, who competed against one another for the fundholding GPs' custom. There was a marginal rise in the rate of increase in NHS productivity, to set against higher transaction costs, but healthcare remained free at the point of service and financed through taxation. Kenneth Arrow's famous essay "Uncertainty and the Welfare Economics of Medical Care" outlines the difficulties of applying principles of competition in the medical care industry. The system was regarded by some as a success: the 1997 Labour government did not entirely abolish it on taking office. GP Fundholding was abolished, but replaced by primary care trusts as purchasers of healthcare. As Klein says this was "universalising fundholding while repudiating the concept".

In October 2014 a row broke out over whether University Hospitals Birmingham NHS Foundation Trust should be allowed to turn away patients from outside its immediate catchment area. Chief Executive Dame Julie Moore said the NHS is neither an effective market nor a managed system. She argued that her hospital was suffering financially because of its success in attracting patients from outside the City.

== Criticism ==
Quasi-markets have been criticised for a number of reasons, including the fact that they might not allow for fair competition between public and private operators and that they might lead to unequal access to services for more disadvantaged people or communities. As a result, cost-shifting may occur in quasi-markets as providers attempt to reduce their expenses and maximise their profits by moving the responsibility for providing care or services to other providers or the government. Quasi-markets can generate an administrative burden for governmental organisations, providers, patients, and students, particularly if there are numerous financing streams and providers to monitor. As a result, this will cost more money.

Critics of quasi-markets argue that they can lead to problems of so-called "cream skimming".

For example, the introduction of open enrollment in UK secondary schools after 1988 (whereby parents could choose which secondary school to send their child to, rather than being limited to the nearest) led to popular schools being oversubscribed. This allowed these schools to select which pupils they would accept, leading some to discriminate against children from low-income backgrounds or non-traditional family structures (e.g. inviting "both" of a child's parents to an informal meeting with the headteacher so as to determine by stealth whether the child comes from an "appropriate" family). Open enrollment also led popular schools to expand their intake, leading to the growth of very large schools with resulting discipline problems, at the expense of smaller schools and rural schools.

== See also ==
- Civic crowdfunding
- Microeconomic reform
- Motivation, Agency, and Public Policy
- New public management
- Public–private partnership
- Tax choice
- The Other Invisible Hand
