= Center for Economic Studies =

German research institute

The Center for Economic Studies (CES) is an independent institute within the Faculty of Economics at LMU Munich.

It promotes the international exchange of knowledge and ideas in public finance and other areas of economics. CES invites visiting scholars to conduct their research in Munich, Germany, and to give a short lecture series in return.

Since its founding in 1991, over 670 academics have visited CES, establishing the basis for the CESifo Research Network. The work of CES is supported and supervised by an advisory council of fourteen international experts.

In 1994 CES also became the co-publisher of Economic Policy, Europe's leading academic journal in this field.

== History ==
CES was founded on January 18, 1991, and launched its visitors program shortly thereafter. Its first guests included Gary Becker, David Bradford, Richard Musgrave, and David Wildasin, who laid the foundation for visits from other renowned economists in the future. In 1994 CES launched its Munich Lectures in Economics, which are jointly organized by the Ifo Institute for Economic Research and supported by MIT Press. Every year the Scientific Advisory Council of CES nominates an outstanding international economist as the Distinguished CES Fellow. The award is presented in November, when the laureate gives the Munich Lectures in Economics on a topical issue to a broad audience.

In 1998, CES became one of the first institutions worldwide to make its discussion of economic issues accessible on the internet. In the same year the center also substantially enlarged its own in-house research group.

Since 1999 CES has worked closely with the Ifo Institute for Economic Research, one of Germany's largest economic research institutes. Both organizations are now part of an umbrella organization, the CESifo Group, and a driving force in building bridges between economic theory and empirical research. The CESifo Group promotes contacts between researchers from all over the world with the aim of making Munich a center of international economic research.

== Distinguished CES Fellows ==
CES hosts a large number of regular seminars and lectures. Many of them are available as video on demand in CESifo's media library.

The most famous academic event is the “Munich Lectures in Economics”. The Distinguished CES Fellow award has been made on an annual basis since 1994. The prize winners are:

- Avinash K. Dixit (1994)
- Anthony B. Atkinson (1995)
- Jean Tirole (1996)
- Paul Krugman (1997)
- Rüdiger Dornbusch (1998)
- Guido Tabellini (1999)
- Peter A. Diamond (2000)
- Oliver Hart (2001)
- Nicholas Stern (2002)
- James Poterba (2003)
- Andrei Shleifer (2004)
- Bruno S. Frey (2005)
- Alberto Alesina (2006)
- Philippe Aghion (2007)
- Olivier Blanchard (2008)
- Robin Boadway (2009)
- Robert Blundell (2010)
- Sir Partha Dasgupta (2011)
- Esther Duflo (2012)
- Ernst Fehr (2013)
- Torsten Persson (2018)
- Amy Finkelstein (2019)
- Nicholas Bloom (2020)
- Matthew Gentzkow (2021)
- Claudia Goldin (2022)
- Janet Currie (2023)
- Edward Glaeser (2026)
