= Shareholder benefit =

Incentive system in a joint-stock company

A shareholder benefit (株主優待, kabunushi yūtai) is an incentive system offered by a joint-stock company to its shareholders who own a certain number of stocks on the date of right allotment (vesting).

== Overview ==
In Japan, the shareholder benefit system is popular, as offered by 1,307 out of the 3,685 listed companies. Nevertheless, there is no legal obligation; it is left entirely to individual companies’ discretion. Therefore, not all companies have implemented it. This system is rare in other countries. According to the survey conducted by the Nihon Keizai Shimbun in April 2017, it is implemented by fewer than 10 companies in the United States and about 30 in the United Kingdom. It has been pointed out that shareholder benefits are in favor uniquely in Japan because of its ingrained gift-giving culture, such as Chūgen mid-year gifts and Seibo year-end gifts as well as the hometown tax gift system. Another reason is that Japanese people tend to hold stock certificates individually. By contrast, in Europe and America, people invest in stocks mainly through mutual funds; therefore, shareholder benefits cannot easily be distributed. Japanese domestic companies do not send shareholder benefits to global investors or Japanese investors residing outside Japan.

The oldest shareholder benefit program in history is said to be a complimentary ticket for boarding the entire Tobu Railway line in 1899. However, Sanyo Railway, offering free-ride tickets to shareholders with 300 or more stocks, is actually the first case. Shareholder benefits started in the railroad industry and gradually spread to other industries, but only a limited number of industries provided shareholder benefits in the prewar period. After the war, companies in the transportation, entertainment, and tourism sectors implemented shareholder benefits, and with the advent of rapid economic growth, manufacturers also began the system with their own products.

Shareholder benefits were carried out by 10% of listed companies in 1993, 20% in 2002, over 30% in 2013, and 36% (1480 of 3664 companies) as of October 2018. About 80% of companies in the foodstuff, fisheries, agriculture, forestry, and retail industries offer shareholder benefits, while less than 20% of companies in nonferrous metals, electricity and gas, glass and ceramics, medical supplies, and petroleum and coal product industries offer them. In addition, many companies have been implementing long-term shareholding benefits to increase the number of stable shareholders since 2004. An increasing number of newly listed stocks have also joined the cohort since 1992.

On the other hand, about 30 companies discontinue shareholder benefits each year due to operational issues such as delisting or deteriorating business performance or due to a sense of unfairness to foreign investors, who do not receive such benefits. As a ratio, 20% to 30% of companies repeal shareholder benefits yearly. The reasons were either delisting (67%) or fair profit distribution consideration (33%).

As of August 2016, the most common types of shareholder benefits are cash vouchers (tradeable coupons redeemable for the company’s goods or services, 471 companies), followed by food products (453 companies). Kaisha Shikiho (Japanese Company Quarterly Handbook) publishes as an appendix a table of rankings on actual dividend yields, including shareholder benefits. In the annual shareholder-benefit popularity rankings conducted by brokerage firms and stock information websites, such companies as AEON, Yoshinoya HD, Oriental Land, ANA Holdings are regular favorites.

The date of allotment (vesting) is typically at the end of accounting periods, the end of the interim accounting periods, or both. Companies whose fiscal year ends in March, which is common in Japan, provide their shareholder benefits in the mid-year Chūgen season or the year-end Seibo period. Some families split shares by family members (i.e., purchase them under different names) and receive multiple benefit items. Others redeem obtained benefit coupons (discount coupons, gift certificates, etc.) through internet auctions or voucher shops, where cash-convertible items are sold at a reduced price.

In addition, overseas investors, investment trusts, and funds redeem items obtained through shareholder benefits (especially cash vouchers and discount coupons that can only be used in Japan) and distribute profits to their investors, although the amount is small compared to dividends. Most corporate shareholders also redeem such items. Many companies offer shareholder benefits even if they do not pay dividends, so many individual investors purchase shares for benefits. Therefore, the number of trades tends to increase on the so-called date of allotment and ex-dividend date.

Privately held companies may also offer shareholder benefits. For example, even before the company went public, StarFlyer had been distributing shareholder discount coupons that allowed holders to purchase tickets at about half the regular price. Similarly, the Osaka Port Transport System had been distributing half-year valid all-line passes (unlimited rides between Osaka Port Station and Nakafuto Station) when it independently operated its own routes. Starbucks had a shareholder benefit program, which was unusual for a U.S.-funded company, but it was repealed due to the company’s delisting following the tender offer announced in 2014.

== Details of benefits ==
The details often change based on the held number of stock certificates. They may also vary depending on how long the shares are held.

- Assortment of the company’s products (mainly in the food and daily necessities manufacturing industry, etc.)
- Gift certificates, discount coupons, and free company service tickets. They are provided by mostly non-manufacturing industries that primarily serve the general public, such as railroad companies, airlines, and retailers.
- In the case of regional companies, local specialty products.
- General-purpose cash vouchers and gift certificates that are unrelated to the company itself (often in industries such as machinery manufacturers and raw material manufacturers whose customers are not the general public).
- Some companies offer the option of making donations to social contribution projects in lieu of benefits items.
