= Henry J. Aaron =

American economist (born 1936)

- Born: Henry Jacob Aaron; 1936 (age 89–90)
- Education: University of California, Los Angeles; Harvard University
- Occupations: Policy analyst, economist
- Employer: Brookings Institution
- Known for: Healthcare policy analysis
- Board member of: Center on Budget and Policy Priorities, Social Security Advisory Board

Henry Jacob Aaron (born 1936) is an American policy analyst and economist. He is the Bruce and Virginia MacLaury Senior Fellow in the Economic Studies Program at the Brookings Institution, where he has been employed since 1968. He served as director of the program from 1990 through 1996.

Aaron was nominated to the Social Security Advisory Board (SSAB) by President Barack Obama, receiving confirmation to the post by the United States Senate in 2014. He served as chairman of the Board of the SSAB. He has been a proponent of a single-payer health care system, though he has questioned the feasibility of implementation in the United States.

In 2010, Aaron was awarded the Daniel M. Holland Medal by the National Tax Association in recognition for lifetime achievement in taxation and public finance.

== Career ==
Aaron graduated from the University of California, Los Angeles and received a Ph.D. in economics from Harvard University. From 1967 until 1989, in addition to his role at Brookings, Aaron taught at the University of Maryland. From 1977 to 1978, he was Assistant Secretary for Planning and Evaluation at the U.S. Department of Health, Education, and Welfare, and the next year, he chaired the Advisory Council on Social Security. From 1996 to 1997, Aaron was a Guggenheim Fellow at the Center for Advanced Study in the Behavioral Sciences at Stanford University. Aaron received the 2007 Robert M. Ball Award for Outstanding Achievements in Social Insurance.

On September 8, 2014, Aaron's nomination by President Barack Obama to be Chairman of the Social Security Advisory Board was confirmed by the Senate by a vote of 54–43.

Aaron concluded that rationing of healthcare was necessary.

== Affiliations ==
Aaron is a member of the Institute of Medicine, the American Academy of Arts and Sciences and the advisory committee of the Stanford Institute for Economic Policy Research. He has been vice-president and member of the executive committee of the American Economics Association and president of the Association of Public Policy and Management. He has also served on the board of trustees of Georgetown University and the board of directors of the College Retirement Equity Fund. He serves on the board of directors of the Center on Budget and Policy Priorities.

== Publications ==
Aaron has written dozens of articles, which have been cited over ten thousand times according to Google Scholar.

Some of his publications with the highest citations include:

- Aaron, Henry J. (1972). Shelter and Subsidies: Who Benefits from Federal Housing Policies?. Washington, DC: Brookings Institution. ISBN 9780815700173.
- Aaron, Henry J. (1975). Who Pays the Property Tax? A New View. Studies of Government Finance, Second Series. Washington, DC: Brookings Institution. ISBN 9780815700227. OCLC 1504973. ERIC ED132676.
- Auerbach, Alan J.; Aaron, Henry J.; Hall, Robert E. (1983). "Corporate Taxation in the United States" (PDF). Brookings Papers on Economic Activity. 1983 (2): 451–513. doi:10.2307/2534295. ISSN 0007-2303. JSTOR 2534295.
- Aaron, Henry J.; Schwartz, William B. (1984). The Painful Prescription: Rationing Hospital Care. Washington, DC: Brookings Institution. ISBN 9780815700340. OCLC 10274789.
- Aaron, Henry (2010). Politics and the Professors: The Great Society in Perspective. Brookings Institution Press. ISBN 978-0-8157-1777-5.
