= Tax choice =

Participatory tax allocation process

In public choice theory, tax choice (sometimes called taxpayer sovereignty, earmarking, participatory taxation or fiscal subsidiarity) is an emerging type of citizen sourcing in which individuals or groups of taxpayers decide how to allocate part of their taxes of a municipal or public budget appropriation through a process of democratic deliberation and decision-making. Its proponents apply the theory of consumer choice to public finance. They claim taxpayers react positively when they are allowed to allocate portions of their taxes to specific spending.

Existing examples of tax choice includes business improvement districts (BID) and tax increment financing (TIF).

== Tax relationship between the state and taxpayers ==
The term tax sovereignty emphasizes the perceived equal status of state and taxpayer, instead of the traditional view of the dominant position of the state in taxation. Tracing back to the legitimacy of the state, Viktoria Raritska points out that “the legitimacy of the state as a formal institution is substantiated by the people’s refusal of their freedoms and an agreement to submit to government in exchange for the protection of their guaranteed rights”. Proponents of tax sovereignty believe that in a traditional system of taxation, the taxpayer gives up their natural liberty in exchange for the protection from the state and the provision of public services; which impels the state to take public interests as its obligation to maintain social order and citizen safety.

This mutual relationship makes taxation a link between the state and taxpayers. Proponents of tax sovereignty believe that in such a relationship, the taxpayer endows power to the state to ensure the satisfaction of the public interest. Furthermore, they propose that the taxpayer has granted the state tax sovereignty. “It is due to the fact that the taxpayer endows the state with tax sovereignty. Thus, state has not only the rights on taxation, but also the obligations, which correspond to the taxpayer's rights”. Therefore, the existence of the state's perceived tax sovereignty is attributed to the taxpayer.

The Swedish economist Knut Wicksell’s theory also argues that "taxation should be based on the principle of value and counter-value, as if taxation was a voluntary transaction between the individual and the state".

== Opinions ==
Daniel J. Brown examines tax-target plans in educational programs.

== Optimal quantities of public goods ==
According to Vincent and Elinor Ostrom, it is possible that government may oversupply, and a market arrangement may undersupply, those public goods for which exclusion is not feasible.

== Foot voting versus tax choice ==
Foot voting and voting with one's taxes are two methods that have been proposed to allow taxpayers to reveal their preferences for public policies. Foot voting refers to where people move to areas that offer a more attractive bundle of public policies. In theory foot voting would force local governments to compete for taxpayers. Tax choice, on the other hand, would allow taxpayers to indicate their preferences with their individual taxes. Wallace E. Oates wrote: "In the Tiebout model, for example, there is costless mobility; individuals seek out a jurisdiction that provides exactly the level of output of the public good that they wish to consume. In so doing, they reveal their preferences for 'local' public outputs and generate a Pareto-efficient outcome in the public sector."

== Legislative measures ==
Four bills involving tax choice have been introduced by the United States Congress since 1971. The Presidential Election Campaign Fund, enacted in 1971, allows taxpayers to allocate $3 of their taxes to presidential election campaigns. The 2000 Taxpayers’ Choice Debt Reduction Act would have allowed taxpayers to designate money toward reduction of the national debt. The 2007 Opt Out of Iraq War Act would have allowed taxpayers to designate money toward certain social programs. The 2011 Put Your Money Where Your Mouth Is Act would have allowed taxpayers to make voluntary contributions (not tax payments) to the government. These later bills died in committee.

== In popular culture ==
When asked what her first executive order as president of the United States would be, Ellen DeGeneres advocated a mix of voluntary taxation and tax choice, stating "you should get to choose where your money goes instead of giving it and just letting them decide, I think you should decide."

In 2009, during the Great Recession, Pope Benedict XVI advocated for a form of tax choice in his third encyclical. He wrote: "One possible approach to development aid would be to apply effectively what is known as fiscal subsidiarity, allowing citizens to decide how to allocate a portion of the taxes they pay to the State. Provided it does not degenerate into the promotion of special interests, this can help to stimulate forms of welfare solidarity from below, with obvious benefits in the area of solidarity for development as well."

In 1983, a short story We, The People by science-fiction writer Jack C. Haldeman II. The plot of the short story involves a man offered the choice to participate in allocating his taxes with the assistance of Artificial intelligence.

"We, the People," written in a flush of bitter anger, but with an undertone of hope -- has over the years gathered me more response than anything else I've ever written. I was told that someone once sent copies to all the members of the Senate when they were considering tax reform. It has been used in classrooms to teach the critical difference between a Democracy and a Republic. I wrote it years ago, but I feel it is as pertinent today as it was when it appeared in Analog magazine. - Jack C. Haldeman II, Political Science Fiction

The short science fiction story by Jack C. Haldeman II, We, The People was originally published in September 1983 in ANALOG.

== Examples ==
=== Iceland ===
Taxpayers in Iceland who belong to an officially registered religious group or secular humanist organization must pay a congregation tax (Icelandic: sóknargjald, plural sóknargjöld) which is deducted from income taxes and goes to the individual's respective organization. In the past, the sóknargjald of those who do not belong to any recognized religious organization went to the University of Iceland, but this was changed in 2009. In cases of individuals not belonging to a registered religious group or secular humanist organization, the amount that would otherwise be used for the sóknargjald remains now part of the income tax budget. In 2015, the monthly sóknargjald amounted to 824 Icelandic krónur, about $US6.

=== Italy ===
Italian taxpayers devolve a compulsory 8 ‰ = 0.8% (eight per mil, i.e. eight per thousand) from their annual income tax return to an organised religion recognised by Italy or, alternatively, to a state-run social assistance scheme.

=== Spain ===
The Spanish tax declaration form has one checkbox for the Catholic Church, none for other religious groups and a second checkbox for activities of social interest. These checkboxes don't influence the total tax amount, but, for each ticked checkbox, 0.7% of the total amount are used as indicated.

=== Japan ===
In Japan, city residents can choose to allocate a portion of their taxes to their hometowns...aka hometown tax. In 2021 more than 7 million taxpayers choose to do so resulting in a total allocation of $6 billion (source).

== See also ==
- Choice architecture
- Hometown tax
- Hypothecated tax
- Microeconomic reform
- New public management
- Participatory budgeting
- Religious Freedom Peace Tax Fund Act
- Conscientious objection to military taxation
- Tax reform
- Voluntary taxation
- YouCut
- Motivation, Agency, and Public Policy
- Nudge
- The Other Invisible Hand
