= School voucher =

Government funding of non-public schools

A school voucher, also called an education voucher, is a certificate of government funding for students at a chosen school. Funding is usually for a particular year, term, or semester. Depending on jurisdiction, a voucher may be used for home schooling expenses or exclusively for private schools, charter schools, or publicly funded schools.

Milton Friedman argued for the modern economic concept of vouchers in the 1950s, stating that free market competition among private schools would improve schools, cost less and yield superior educational outcomes than publicly funded schools. Proponents of school vouchers, including Friedrich Hayek, also argue that voucher systems provide consumer sovereignty, thus increasing school performance and accountability. Friedman's argument has nonetheless been criticised for promoting cream-skimming among students, the random nature of lottery-style voucher allocation systems, the inherent inequality in some students having to attend less preferred schools, and the diversion of public funding away from public education.

Research on the empirical effects of school vouchers has produced mixed results. On one hand, some studies find that, after adjusting for demographic factors, private and public schools performed similarly, and that voucher programs can contribute to segregation. Other studies show that increased competition indeed leads to better educational outcomes across the board and actually reduces racial and socio-economic division.

== Definition ==
School vouchers are often distributed to enable students to attend private schools, charter schools, and publicly funded schools. Educational subsidies can also take the form of comprise government-created bank accounts, whose funds are specifically used for educational purposes, and education tax credits.

Government intervention in education typically takes two forms. The first approach is broad, comprising the institution of charter schools, magnet schools, or for-profit schools, and increasing competition. The second approach is individually focused and comprises providing subsidies or loans for individuals.

== Economics ==
Milton Friedman argued for the modern economic concept of vouchers in the 1950s, stating that free market competition among private schools would improve schools, cost less and yield superior educational outcomes than publicly funded schools. Further, proponents of Friedman's theory, including Friedrich Hayek, argue that voucher systems provide consumer sovereignty, thus increasing school performance and accountability. The free-market theory of school vouchers has been analogised to the competition between universities and the provision of government aid or scholarships for university students, which has arguably had a positive impact on research and teaching in higher education. Major proponents of Friedman's theory include Friedman's own non-governmental organisation EdChoice and the Sutherland Institute.

Friedman's reasoning in favor of vouchers gained additional attention in 1980 with the broadcast of his ten-part television series Free to Choose and the publication of its companion book of the same name. Friedman's argument has been criticised for its implicit assumption that the prices of private schools are competitive owing to differences in teaching and administration, rather than its cream-skimming approach to selecting only students who come from wealthy or otherwise advantaged backgrounds.

In contrast, the United States's National Education Association has criticised the random nature of lottery-style voucher allocation systems, the inherent inequality in some students having to attend less preferred and less competitive schools, and the diversion of public funding away from public education, which may in turn weaken public schooling standards.

A random survey of 210 economists of the American Economic Association, found that over two-thirds support giving parents educational vouchers that can be used at government-operated or privately operated schools, particularly for low-income students or students in poorly performing schools.

Basic School Voucher Utility Maximization Picture

=== Background ===
Governments have multiple incentives for intervention in and improvement of public education, including human capital accumulation, the promotion of societal values and norms, and positive externalities such as the reduction of crime and economic development. Families face a bundle of consumption choices that determine how much they will spend on education and private consumption, with the corresponding indifference curve representing how much education an individual will want to consume versus how much private consumption an individual will want to consume. Vouchers are thus typically instituted for two broad economic reasons: to enable consumer choice; and to increase market competition among schools.

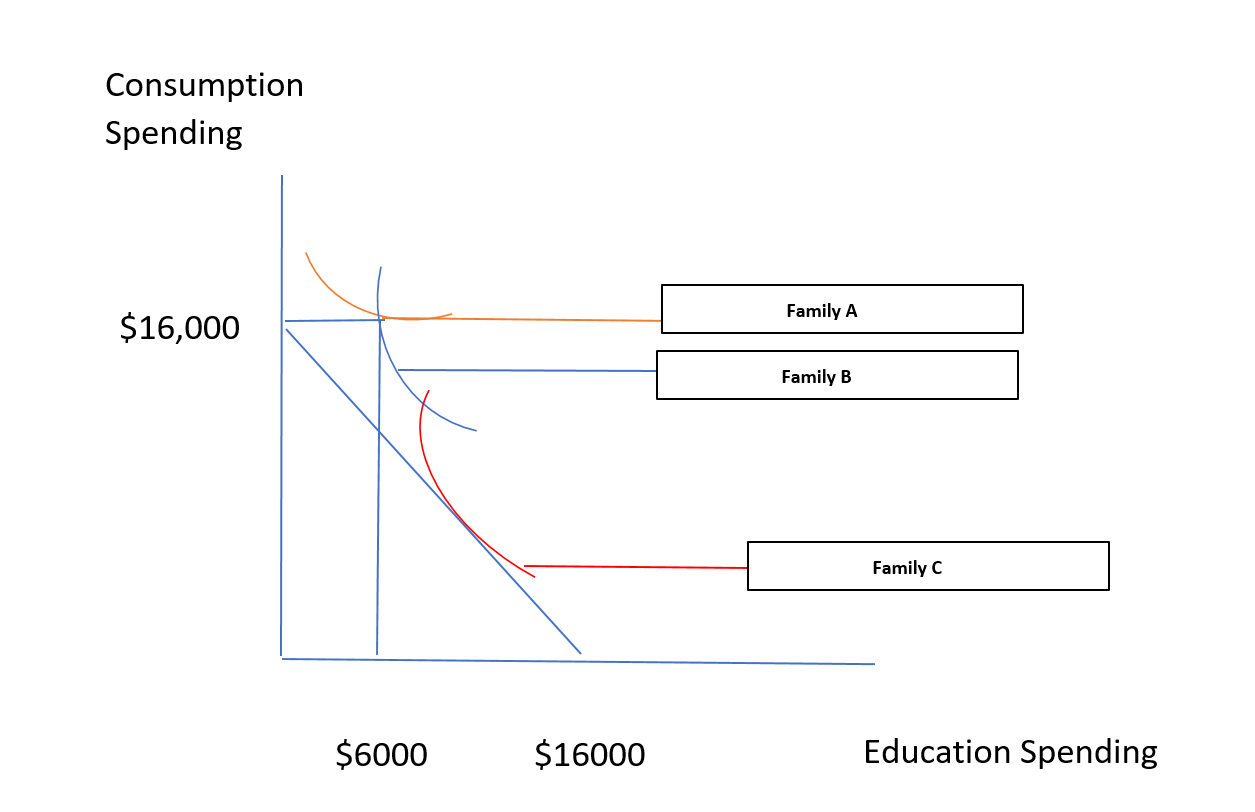
Education Consumption Choices

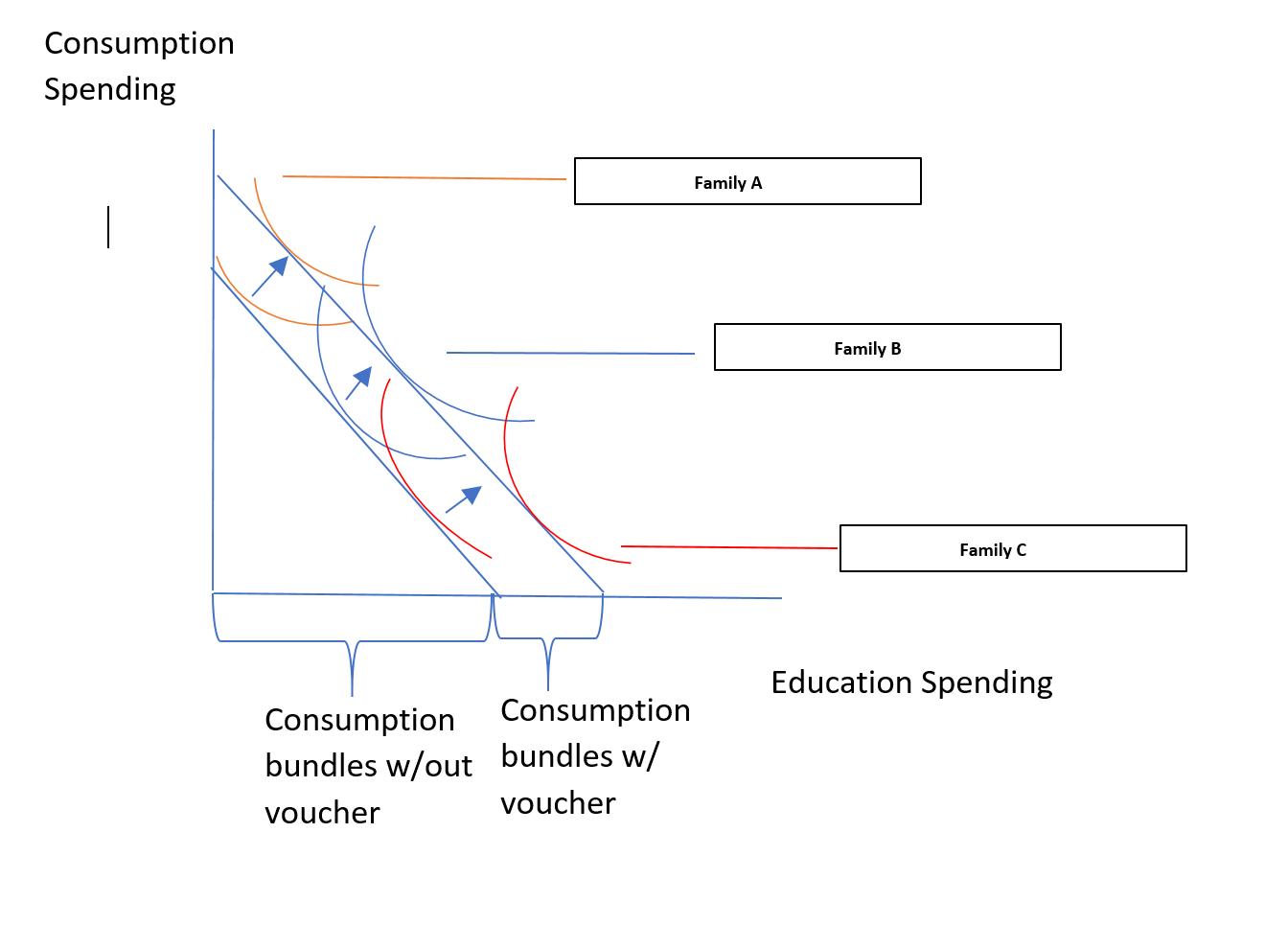
Family consumption bundles with vouchers

=== Empirical effects ===
Research has produced mixed results. A 2017 review of the economics literature on school vouchers concluded that "the evidence to date is not sufficient to warrant recommending that vouchers be adopted on a widespread basis; however, multiple positive findings support continued exploration". Some studies, including a 2006 United States Department of Education report, conclude that, after adjusting for demographic factors, private and public schools performed similarly. At the same time, a 2021 meta-analysis found "moderate evidence of positive achievement impacts of private school vouchers, with substantial effect heterogeneity across programs and outcome years" as well as evidence suggesting that "voucher interventions may be cost-effective even for null achievement impacts."

Other studies suggest that voucher programs can contribute to segregation and lack accountability for taxpayer funds. Nonetheless, other research has also shown that under certain circumstances, income and racial segregation can be reduced indirectly by increasing school choice. Additionally, it is possible that private school vouchers may offset the overall budget by way of public school cost savings from lower enrollments. Resulting job losses in the public sector may also, potentially, be offset by the increased demand for jobs in the private sector.

A 2018 study by Abdulkadiroğlu et al. found that disadvantaged students who won a lottery to get vouchers to attend private schools had worse education outcomes than disadvantaged students who did not win vouchers.

==== Colombia ====
Studies of Colombia's PACES voucher program indicate the program increased private school attendance and academic outcomes. After three years, lottery winners were 15 percentage points more likely to attend private schools, completed 0.1 more years of schooling on average, and were 10 percentage points more likely to complete eighth grade. Test scores for voucher recipients were 0.2 standard deviations higher than non-recipients, with stronger effects in mathematics for boys compared to girls. The program had no significant effect on dropout rates but was associated with reduced teenage employment and lower likelihood of early marriage or cohabitation among lottery winners.

==== Sweden ====
A 2004 study found that competition from independent schools improved public school performance. However, Sweden's PISA rankings declined in the 2000s, though some attribute this to factors unrelated to the voucher system. A 2015 study reported that a higher share of independent school students correlated with improved educational outcomes, largely due to increased competition. According to Susanne Wiborg, Sweden's voucher system introduced in 1992 has "augmented social and ethnic segregation, particularly in relation to schools in deprived areas".

==== United States ====
A 2003 study by the Manhattan Institute for Policy Research concludes that public schools located near private schools that were eligible to accept voucher students made significantly more improvements, including in academic test scores, than similar schools not located near eligible private schools. Caroline Hoxby studied the effects of vouchers in Milwaukee and of charter schools in Arizona and Michigan on nearby public schools, finding that public schools forced to compete made greater test-score gains than schools not faced with such competition, and that the so-called effect of cream skimming did not exist in any of the voucher districts examined.

A CATO Institute study of public and private school per pupil spending in Phoenix, Los Angeles, D.C., Chicago, New York City, and Houston found that public schools spend 93% more than the estimated median private schools.

A 2013 study of Milwaukee's Parental Choice Program, which funds vouchers for both religious and nonreligious private institutions, posited that the use of vouchers increased the probability that a student would graduate from high school, go to college, and stay in college. A 2015 paper published by the National Bureau of Economic Research found that participation in Louisiana's voucher program "substantially reduces academic achievement", which may reflect the poor quality of private schools in the program. A 2014 analysis of the competitive effects of school vouchers in Florida suggests that more competition improves performance in regular public schools.

Historically, data suggests that voucher programs have been used to further segregate Americans. Further, some data has shown that the effects of voucher programs such as the New York City School Choice Scholarship Program, are marginal when it comes to increasing student achievement.

== History ==
When France lost the Franco-Prussian War (1870–1871) many blamed the loss on its inferior military education system. Following this defeat, the French Assembly proposed a voucher that they hoped would improve schools by allowing students to seek out the best. This proposal never moved forward due to the reluctance of the French to subsidize religious education. Despite its failure, this proposal closely resembles voucher systems proposed or used in many modern countries.

The oldest extant school voucher programs in the United States are the Town Tuitioning programs in Vermont and Maine, respectively beginning in 1869 and 1873. Because some towns in these states operate neither local high schools nor elementary schools, vouchers provide for students in these towns to attend either public schools in other towns or secular private schools.

A system of educational vouchers was introduced in the Netherlands in 1917. As of 1997, more than 70% of pupils attend privately run but publicly funded schools, mostly split along denominational lines.

In some Southern states during the 1960s, school vouchers were used as a way to perpetuate segregation. In a few instances, public schools were closed outright and vouchers were issued to parents. Many of the vouchers were only good at new, private and segregated schools, known as segregation academies.

== Implementations ==
=== Colombia ===
The Colombian government launched the PACES voucher program in 1991 to support low-income secondary school students in neighborhoods within the two lowest socioeconomic strata. From 1991 to 1997, the program distributed 125,000 vouchers, valued at approximately US$190 in 1998, though students typically incurred additional costs averaging US$340 for private school fees. Students were selected by lottery, with vouchers renewable annually based on satisfactory academic progress.

=== Chile ===
In 1981, Chile introduced a universal school voucher system for elementary and secondary students, leading to the establishment of over 1,000 private schools and a 20–40% increase in private school enrollment by 1998, exceeding 50% in some urban areas. Urban private school enrollment grew 11% faster than in rural areas from 1981 to 1988. Unlike public schools, which accepted all students, private voucher schools could be selective, and voucher values were not income-based. Low international test scores prompted major educational reforms in 2008, including changes to the voucher system.

The 2008 Preferential School Subsidy Law adjusted vouchers to account for family income, providing 50% higher vouchers to students from the lowest 40% income bracket, deemed "priority students." Schools with more priority students received additional per-student bonuses. The program initially covered preschool through fourth grade, expanding annually. Most public schools and two-thirds of private subsidized elementary schools participated in 2008. Participating schools could not charge fees to priority students, select students based on academic ability, or expel them for academic reasons, and they were required to join an accountability system monitoring financial and academic performance.

=== Europe ===
In most European countries, education for all primary and secondary schools is fully subsidized. In some countries (e.g., Belgium or France), parents are free to choose which school their child attends.

==== France ====
In France, parents can choose between public and private schools, with about 20% of students attending private institutions. Most private schools operate under contract with the government, which covers teachers' salaries and requires adherence to the national curriculum. These schools charge low fees for other costs. Non-contracted private schools have more curricular flexibility but charge higher fees, as they fund teacher salaries independently. Homeschooling is permitted but tightly regulated, with restrictions tightened in 2022 to limit it to specific cases, such as for students with disabilities or those in nomadic communities.

==== Ireland ====
Ireland does not use a school voucher system.

==== Sweden ====
Sweden introduced a school vouchers system (skolpeng) in 1992, allowing parents to choose between public and privately run independent schools (fristående skolor). Both school types receive public funding from the local municipality solely based on student enrollment. By 2008, over 10% of students attended independent schools, with enrollment rising rapidly.

=== Hong Kong ===
In 2007, Hong Kong implemented a voucher system for children aged three to six attending non-profit kindergartens, providing HK$13,000 per student annually. Of this, HK$10,000 subsidizes school fees, and HK$3,000 supports teacher training. Vouchers are restricted to non-profit kindergartens with annual fees below HK$24,000. The program was later extended to children who were enrolled in for-profit kindergartens before September 2007, with subsidies up to HK$30,000 offered to for-profit kindergartens converting to non-profit status.

Milton Friedman criticised the system, arguing that the point of a voucher system is to provide a competitive marketplace, and thus should not be limited to non-profit kindergartens.

=== Philippines ===
In 2015, the Philippines introduced a senior high school voucher program that provides qualifications for students in grades 11–12. the Department of Education (DepED) implements senior high school voucher program in 2016. The value of the voucher attends in private schools costs P22,500 (National Capital Region), P20,000 (Highly Urbanized Cities), and P17,500 (outside) from public schools, P18,000 (National Capital Region), P16,000 (Highly Urbanized Cities), and P14,000 (outside) from private schools.

=== United States ===
In the 1980s, the Reagan administration promoted school vouchers, as did the George W. Bush administration in its initial education reform proposals leading up to the No Child Left Behind Act. As of December 2016, 14 states and the District of Columbia had school voucher programs. Including scholarship tax credits and education savings accounts, 27 states plus the District of Columbia had private school choice programs, most of them targeting disadvantaged students. By 2014, around 250,000 students were enrolled in voucher or tax-credit scholarship programs, compared with 55 million in public schools.

As of 2025, the Indiana Choice Scholarships program is the largest school voucher program in the United States.

Supporters of voucher programs include New Jersey Senator Cory Booker, former governor of South Carolina Mark Sanford, billionaire and American philanthropist John T. Walton, Former mayor of Baltimore Kurt L. Schmoke, Former Massachusetts Governor Mitt Romney and John McCain.

==== Legal issues ====
School vouchers have also been challenged on legal grounds. In Zelman v. Simmons-Harris (2002), the Supreme Court, in a 5–4 decision, held that Ohio's voucher plan did not violate the Establishment Clause merely by giving money to parents who choose to send their child to a religious school. By contrast, the Florida Supreme Court struck down that state's Opportunity Scholarship Program in 2006, ruling that it violated constitutional provisions requiring a uniform system of public schools. In 2013, the Louisiana Supreme Court ruled that Louisiana's use of money earmarked, via the Louisiana Constitution, for public schools to fund Louisiana's voucher program was unconstitutional.

==== Administrative issues ====
People who can benefit from vouchers may not know it. In April 2012, a bill passed in Louisiana that made vouchers available to low-income families whose children attended poorly ranked schools. Of the estimated 380,000 eligible students during the school year when the bill was passed, only 5,000 students knew about, applied for, and accepted the vouchers.

Voucher programs often may not be implemented with the necessary safeguards that prevent institutions from discriminating against marginalized communities. In the United States, as of 2016, there are currently no state laws that require voucher programs to not discriminate against marginalized communities.

Some school voucher systems may also lack accountability to taxpayers. At the same time, tax credit systems relating to donations to voucher-distributing non-governmental organisations may be used as a means to reduce taxes without substantially benefitting low-income students.

==== Trump's 2018 budget ====
President Donald Trump proposed a 2018 budget that included $250 million for voucher initiatives, state-funded programs that pay for students to go to private school.

==== Teaching creationism instead of evolution ====
Some private religious schools in voucher programs teach creationism instead of the theory of evolution. Over 300 schools in the U.S. have been documented as teaching creationism and receiving taxpayer money. A strict definition of state-funded religious education was narrowly deemed constitutional in Zelman v. Simmons-Harris (2002). At least 35 states have passed various Blaine Amendments restricting or prohibiting public funding of religious education. However, Espinoza v. Montana Department of Revenue (2020) ruled that it is unconstitutional to disqualify all religious schools from receiving public funds that other private schools are eligible to get.

== See also ==
- Scholarship
- School choice
- Student debt
- Student loan
