= Hilary Hoynes =

American economist

- Born: August 31, 1961 (age 65)
- Known for: Anti-poverty work
- Children: 2
- Parent: Jeffrey G. Williamson
- Awards: Carolyn Shaw Bell Award (2014)

Academic background
- Education: Colby College, 1983; Stanford University (Phd)
- Thesis: Welfare Transfers in Two-Parent Families : Labor Supply and Welfare Participation Under the Aid to Families with Dependent Children-Unemployed Parent Program (1992)
- Doctoral advisor: Thomas MaCurdy

Academic work
- Discipline: Economics
- Institutions: University of California, Davis; University of California, Berkeley
- Website: www.hilaryhoynes.com

Hilary Williamson Hoynes is an economist and Haas Distinguished Chair in Economic Disparities at the Richard and Rhoda Goldman School of Public Policy at the University of California at Berkeley. She studies the impact of tax and transfer programs on low-income families, particularly single parent families. She was the 2014 winner of the Carolyn Shaw Bell Award from the Committee on the Status of Women in the Economics Profession. She has been a co-editor of the American Economic Review, co-editor of American Economic Journal: Economic Policy, Associate editor of Journal of Public Economics and Journal of Economic Perspectives.

In 2023, Hoynes was elected to the National Academy of Sciences. In 2024, she was awarded the Daniel M. Holland Medal by the National Tax Association in recognition for lifetime achievement in taxation and public finance.

== Research ==
Her research has covered every major government anti-poverty program in the United States, including The Earned Income Tax Credit, Food Stamps, and Temporary Assistance for Needy Families, and has examined outcomes such as labor supply, employment, marriage, divorce, infant health, and education. She has found that people who lived in counties that adopted the Food Stamp program before their third birthday had better health later in life. Hoynes and her co-authors Almond and Schanzenbach were the first to contribute to the idea that FSP improves birth weights. They saw that the group receiving the FSP(treated) reduced the low birth weight by 7% for whites and between 5% and 11% for blacks. The authors do mention that not all treatment effects are statically significant; still they point to improvements in birth weights following the introduction of the Food Stamp Program. In her research with Almond and Schanzenbach they also explain that recipients of the FSP who are infra-marginal see in-kind transfers, like FSP, as an equivalent to cash; with this the authors expect an increase in both food consumption and normal goods. The Earned Income Tax Credit does much more to encourage parents' work and to reduce poverty among children at a lower cost to the federal budget than the Child Tax Credit and that Head Start. Preschool programs have longer-lasting impacts for children who do not speak English at home, Hoynes describes the EITC as the "cornerstone of U.S anti-poverty policy". Hoynes and Ankur J. Patel found that the 1993 expansion of the EITC increased employment for single mothers with less than a college degree by 6.1 percentage points. She suggests that there is growing evidence that the EITC improves children's cognitive outcomes and educational achievement from elementary school through college. Since the Great Recession, Hoynes' research has focused on the performance of anti-poverty programs in recessions.

One important policy report regarding child poverty in which Dr. Hoynes took part in was as study done by California Policy Labs. This report looked at the expansion of the Child Tax Credit (CTC) and other safety-net programs to see their effects on eligible families in California. Findings found that by extending the CTC over 610,000 children became eligible in the state of California, however 38% of those eligible did not apply. Families which don't apply for these programs are almost entirely no wage earners which do not file taxes. Policy makers which use a tax filing system to distribute stimuli will end up overlooking these zero income families leading to the high number of 42% no income earners not receiving these benefits. The study concluded with a need for policy makers to recognize who might be missing out on the benefits of these programs and how to ensure everyone is included.

Hoynes has research affiliations at the National Bureau of Economic Research, the University of California, Davis Center for Poverty Research and the Institute for Fiscal Studies. She serves on the National Advisory Committee of the Robert Wood Johnson Foundation Scholars in Health Policy Research Program and the Advisory Committee for the National Science Foundation's Directorate for the Social, Behavioral, and Economic Sciences. In 2016 Hoynes was appointed as a member of the Commission on Evidence-Based Policymaking.

=== Selected works ===
- Eissa, Nada, and Hilary Williamson Hoynes. "Taxes and the labor market participation of married couples: the earned income tax credit." Journal of Public Economics 88.9-10 (2004): 1931–1958.
- Hoynes, Hilary. Welfare transfers in two-parent families: labor supply and welfare participation under AFDC-UP. No. w4407. National Bureau of Economic Research, 1996.
- Eissa, Nada, and Hilary W. Hoynes. "Behavioral responses to taxes: Lessons from the EITC and labor supply." Tax Policy and the Economy 20 (2006): 74–110.
- Bitler, Marianne, Jonah B. Gelbach, and Hilary W. Hoynes. "What mean impacts miss: Distributional effects of welfare reform experiments." American Economic Review 96.4 (2006): 988–1012.
- Hoynes, Hilary, Douglas L. Miller, and Jessamyn Schaller. "Who suffers during recessions?." Journal of Economic Perspectives 26.3 (2012): 27–48.
- Ramesh, Brett Fischer, Hilary Hoynes, Karla Palos, Aparna (October 26, 2022). "How the Expanded Child Tax Credit Helped California Families". California Policy Lab. Retrieved November 2, 2023.
