= Social Security Works =

American political advocacy group

- Formation: 2010
- Founders: Nancy Altman; Eric Kingson
- Type: Advocacy group
- Purpose: Expansion of Social Security, Medicare, and Medicaid; lower drug prices; health care as a human right
- Headquarters: Washington, D.C., U.S.
- Members: Over 1,000,000
- Key people: Nancy Altman (President); Eric Kingson (Chair of the Board); Alex Lawson (Executive Director); Jon "Bowzer" Bauman (PAC President)
- Website: socialsecurityworks.org

Social Security Works is an American political advocacy group that calls for expansion of Social Security.

== History ==
Nancy Altman and Eric Kingson founded Social Security Works in 2010. Altman serves on the Social Security Advisory Board.

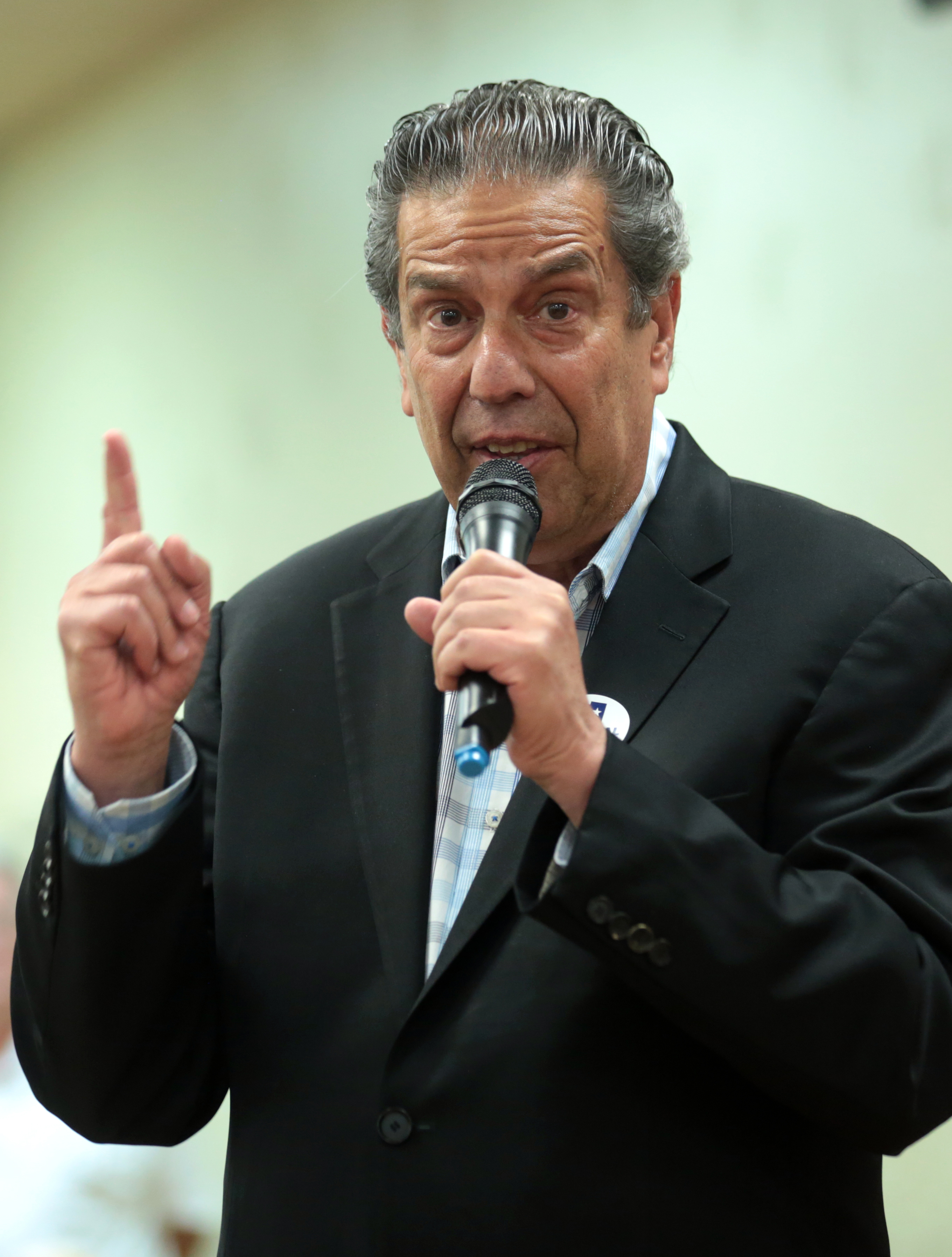
Jon Bowzer Bauman in 2018

Social Security Works PAC is a political action committee created in 2017 that works to expand Social Security, Medicare, and Medicaid. Jon Bauman is the PAC president.

== Activities ==
Social Security Works has over a million members. It promotes health care as a human right and seeks lower drug prices.

== See also ==
- Expand Social Security Caucus
