= Edwin Cannan =

British economist and economic historian

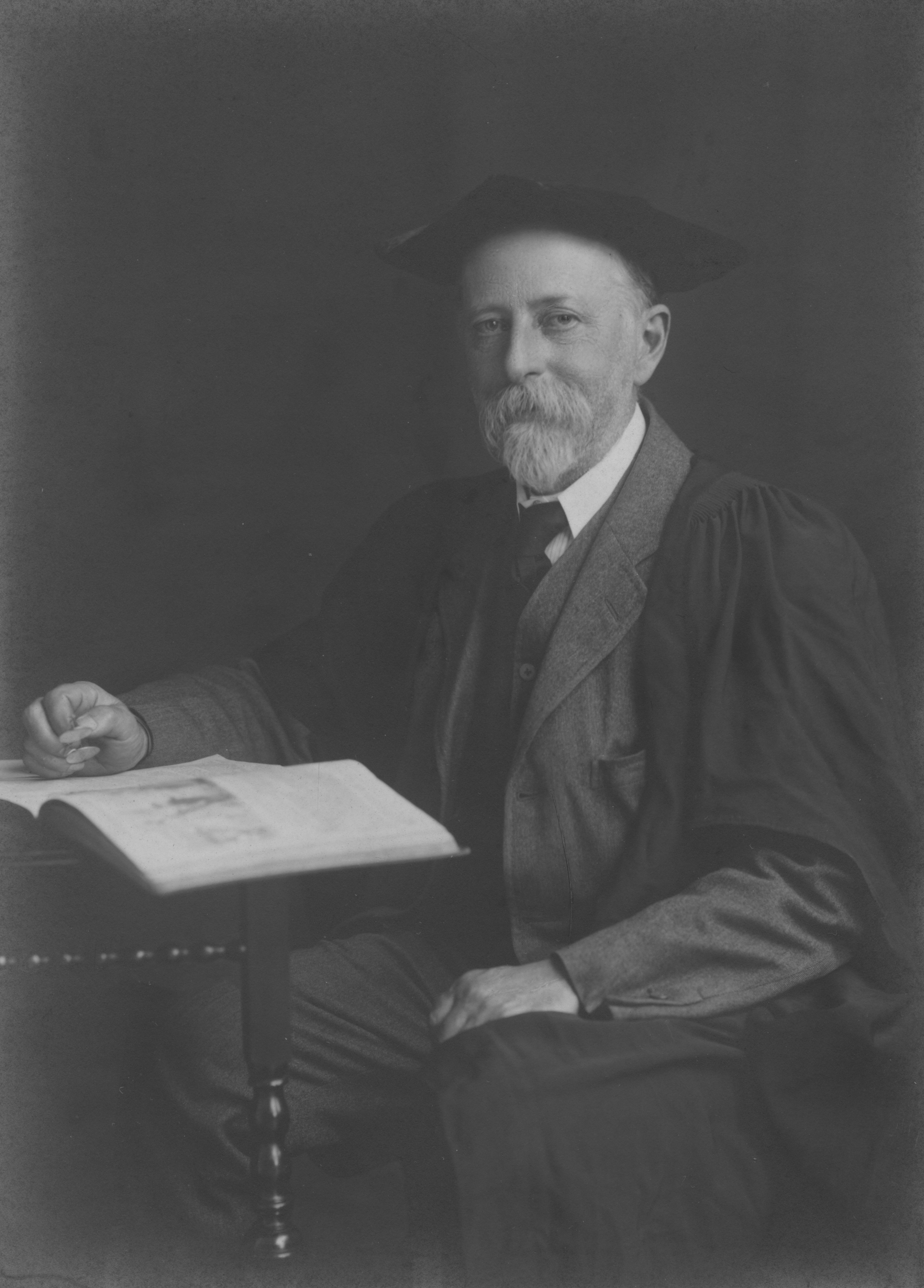
- Edwin Cannan, c. 1920
- Born: 3 February 1861; Funchal, Madeira, Portugal
- Died: 8 April 1935 (aged 74); Bournemouth, England
- Resting place: Wolvercote Cemetery, Oxford
- Spouse: Margaret Mary Cullen (m. 1907)
- Children: David Cannan
- Parent(s): David Alexander Cannan (father); Jane Dorothea Claude (mother)
- Relatives: Charles Cannan (brother); May Wedderburn Cannan (niece); Joanna Cannan (niece); Gilbert Cannan

Academic background
- Education: Balliol College, Oxford

Academic work
- Discipline: Economics; Political Economy; History of Economic Thought
- School or tradition: classical liberalism
- Institutions: London School of Economics
- Notable students: Dr. B.R. Ambedkar; Arnold Plant; Lionel Robbins; Theodore Gregory; William Harold Hutt; Frederic Benham

Edwin Cannan (3 February 1861 – 8 April 1935) was a British economist and historian of economic thought. He taught at the London School of Economics from 1895 to 1926.

== Biography ==
Edwin Cannan was the younger son of David Alexander Cannan and artist Jane Dorothea Claude. His mother died at the age of 38 of tuberculosis in Madeira, Portugal 18 days after her son Edwin was born. He studied at Balliol College, Oxford.

As a follower of William Stanley Jevons, Edwin Cannan is perhaps best known for his logical dissection and critique of classical economic theory in his famous 1894 tract A History of the Theories of Production and Distribution. Although Cannan had personal and professional difficulties with Alfred Marshall, he was still "Marshall's man" at the LSE from 1895 to 1926. During that time, particularly during his tenure as professor of political economy from 1907 onwards, Edwin Cannan shepherded the LSE away from its roots in Fabian socialism into tentative Marshallianism. This period was only to last, however, until his protégé, Lionel Robbins, took over with his more "Continental" (i.e. Austrian) ideas.

Though Cannan, in his early years as an economist, was a critic of classical economics and an ally of interventionists (he read an early paper to the Fabian Society in 1889), he moved sharply to the side of classical liberalism in the early 20th century. He favoured simplicity, clarity, and common sense in the exposition of economics. Cannan emphasised the institutional foundation of economic systems. Cannan opposed the views of Thomas Robert Malthus on overpopulation, arguing that an "optimum population" from the maximum productivity point of view will vary.

Cannan became president of the Royal Economic Society in 1932.

He is buried at Wolvercote Cemetery Oxford, England.

== Major works ==
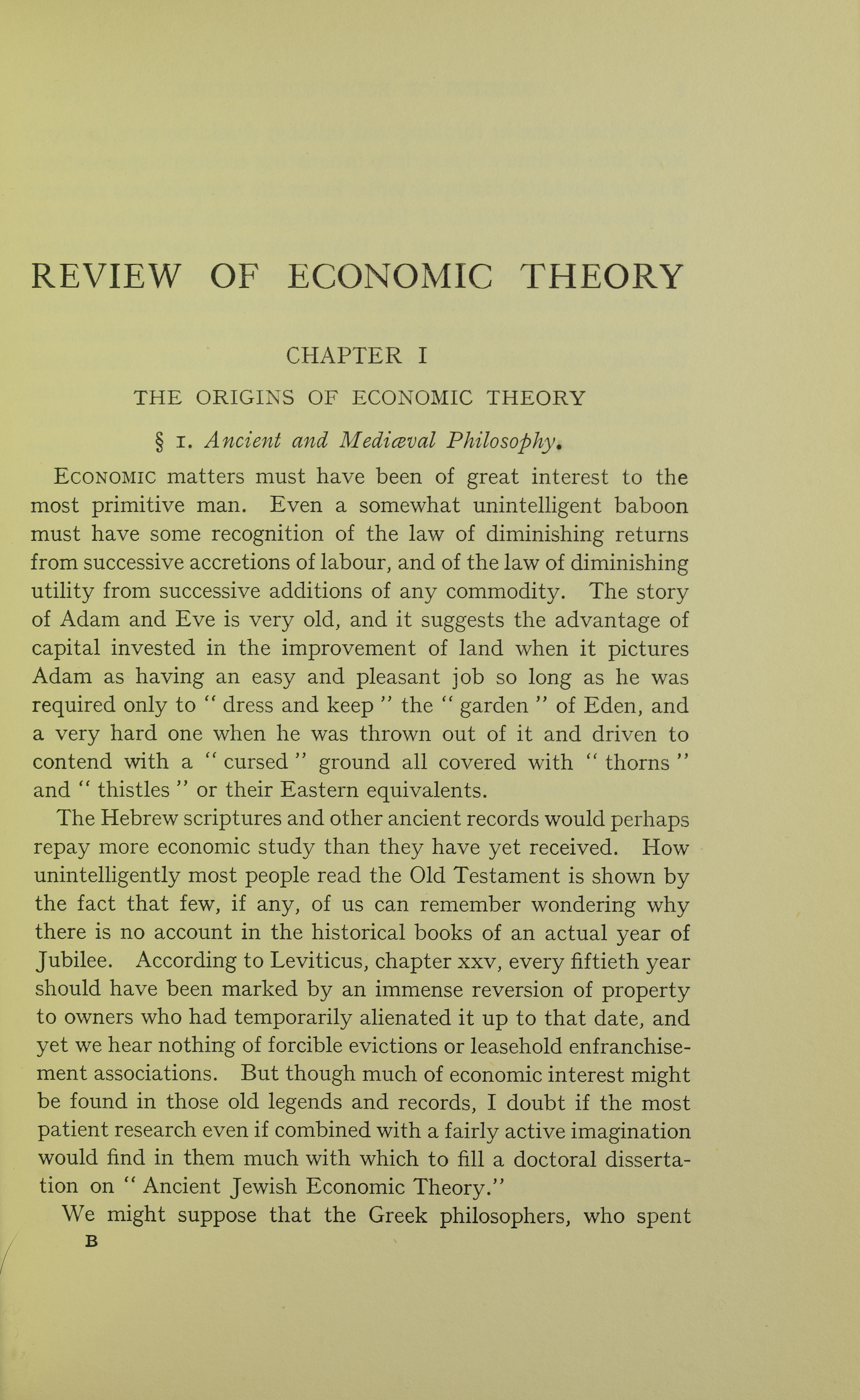
Review of economic theory, 1929

- The Duke of Saint Simon. Oxford and London: B.H. Blackwell; Simpkin, Marshall and Co. 1885 – via Google Books.
- Elementary Political Economy. London: Henry Frowde. 1888 – via Internet Archive.
- The Origin of the Law of Diminishing Returns, 1813-15, 1892, The Economic Journal (EJ).
- Ricardo in Parliament, 1894, EJ.
- Cannan, Edwin (1894). A History of the Theories of Production and Distribution in English Political Economy from 1776 to 1848. London: Rivington, Percival & Co – via Internet Archive.
- Cannan, Edwin, ed. (1896). "Preface, Introduction". Lectures on Justice, Police, Revenue and Arms delivered in the University of Glasgow by Adam Smith and reported by a Student in 1763 (First ed.). Oxford: Clarendon Press – via Internet Archive.
- The History of Local Rates in England. London, New York and Bombay: Longmans, Green and Co. 1896 – via Internet Archive. 2nd edition, 1912
- "Preface, Introduction, Notes, Marginal Summary". An Inquiry into the Nature and Causes of the Wealth of Nations by Adam Smith. London: Methuen. 1904 – via Online Library of Liberty.
- The Economic Outlook. London and Leipsic: T. Fisher Unwin. 1912 – via Internet Archive.
- "Introduction". The Paper Pound of 1797-1821: A Reprint of the Bullion Report. London: P. S. King & Son. 1919 – via Internet Archive.
- Wealth: A Brief Explanation of the Causes of Economic Welfare (3rd ed.). London: P. S. King and Son, Ltd. 1928 – via Internet Archive.; via Mises.org.
- Coal nationalisation; précis and evidence offered to the Coal Industry Commission. London: P.S. King & Son, Ltd. 1919 – via Internet Archive.
- Early History of the term "Capital", 1921, QJE.
- An Application of the Theoretical Apparatus of Supply and Demand to Units of Currency, 1921, EJ.
- Money: Its connexion with rising and falling prices (2nd ed.). London: P.S. King & Son, Ltd. 1920 – via Internet Archive.; 7th ed., 1932, via Mises.org.
- Monetary Reform, with J.M. Keynes, Addis and Milner, 1924, EJ
- An Economist's Protest. London: P.S. King & Son, Ltd. 1927 – via Internet Archive.
- A Review of Economic Theory. New York: A.M. Kelley. 1929 – via Internet Archive.
- Modern Currency and the Regulation of Its Value. London: P.S. King & Son, Ltd. 1931 – via Internet Archive.
- Economic Scares. London: P.S. King & Son, Ltd. 1933 – via Internet Archive.
- Ebenstein, Alan, ed. (1998). Collected Works of Edwin Cannan in 8 volumes. London & New York: Routledge/Thoemmes Press. vol. 3

== See also ==
- William Harold Hutt
