= National Tax Association =

Non-profit organization in United States

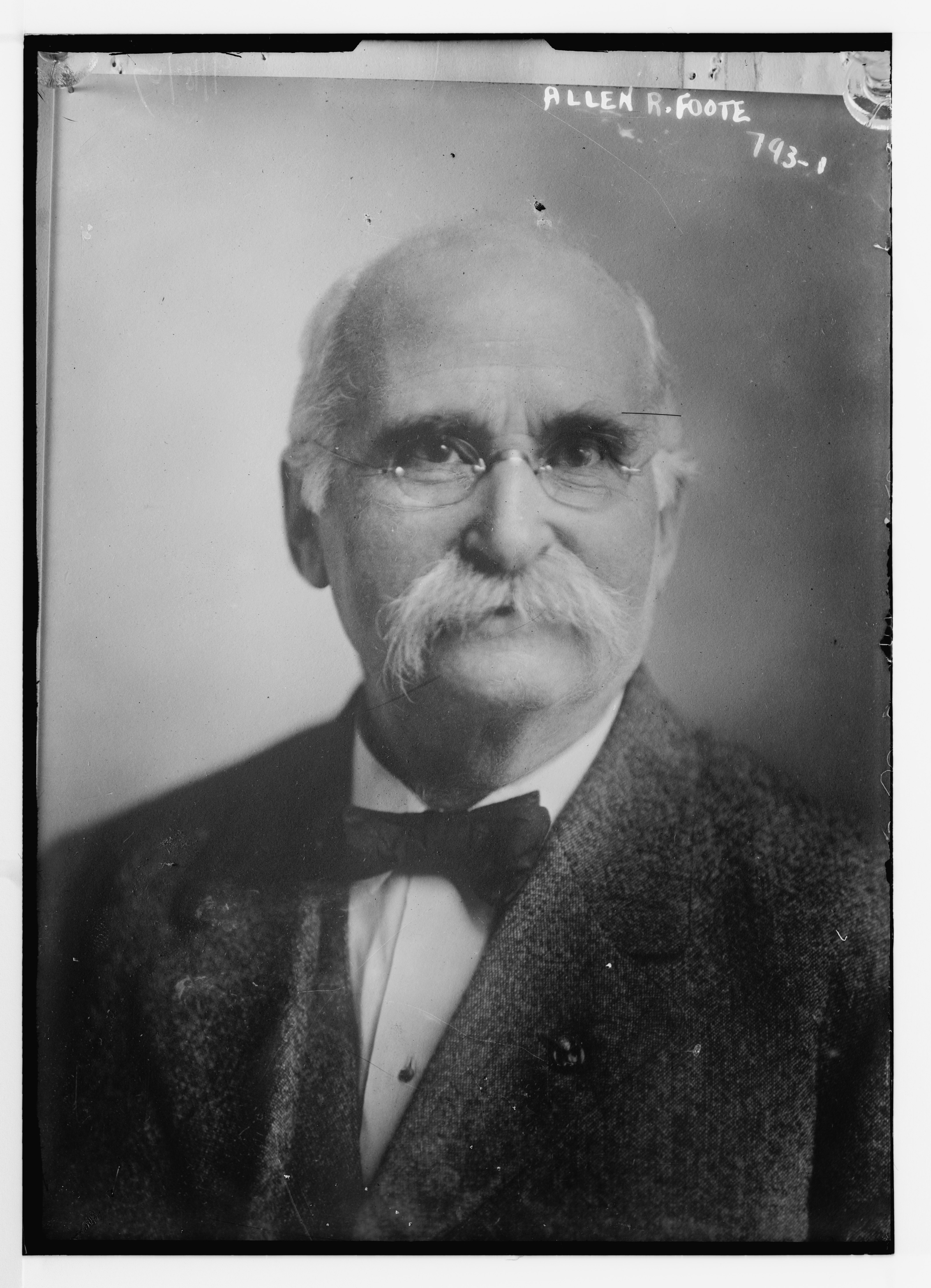
Allen R. Foote of Ohio, a founder and first president of the National Tax Association

The National Tax Association – Tax Institute of America (NTA) is a US non-profit, non-partisan organization committed to the study and discussion of public taxation, spending, and borrowing decisions by governments around the world. Since its founding in 1907, the NTA has remained the leading association of tax professionals and public finance scholars devoted to advancing the theory and practice of public finance. Its focus remains on education rather than political debate. The organization educates government officials, tax professionals, and the general public. It hosts events and publishes the National Tax Journal.

The National Tax Association was founded in Ohio in 1907 by a group of "nearly 100 lawyers, university professors, business leaders, and government administrators". The organization's initial goal was to advocate for tax reform with the goal of creating alternate taxation models which could then be adopted by municipalities. However, due to a long-term lack of consensus on how to replace the property tax, its focus moved away from tax reform in 1930. In the 2000s, the organization consists in large part of public finance economists.

== Awards ==
Every year, the NTA awards a number of awards recognizing exceptional achievement in tax and public finance:

- Daniel M. Holland Medal
- Davie-Davis Public Service Award
- Stephen D. Gold Award
- NTJ Richard Musgrave Prize
- NTJ Referee Award
- Doctoral Dissertation Award

=== Holland Medal ===
The Daniel M. Holland Medal was created in memory of Daniel Holland, Professor of Economics at the MIT Sloan School of Management. It is the most prestigious award given by the NTA. Every year, a committee of NTA members constituted by the Board of Directors makes a formal nomination of the award recipient each year, which is then subject to approval by the Board. Current NTA officers and members of the Board of Directors cannot be nominated.

Recipients of the Daniel M. Holland Medal
Year	Recipient(s)	Recognition	Affiliated institute(s)
2025	James Alm	Recognized for research on the behavioral, distributional, and revenue effects of taxes, with a particular focus on tax compliance, the marriage penalty/bonus, fiscal federalism, and the disparate impact by race ethnicity, and gender of the U.S. income tax code.	Tulane University, Georgia State University
2024	Hilary Hoynes	Conducted deep research into every major government anti-poverty program in the United States, including the Earned Income Tax Credit, the Supplemental Nutrition Assistance Program, and Temporary Assistance for Needy Families.	University of California, Berkeley, Haas School of Business
2023	Daniel Shaviro	Recognized for contributions to tax policy and fiscal policy, particularly the study of inequality and the intersections between law, literature, and social science.	New York University School of Law
2022	Jane Gravelle	Wrote hundreds of research reports for Congress and made testimonials before congressional committees as the Senior Specialist in Economic Policy at the Congressional Research Service.	Congressional Research Service
2021	Rosanne Altshuler	Recognition for service on the Tax Policy Center, the President's Advisory Panel on Federal Tax Reform, the United States Congressional Joint Committee on Taxation, and the National Tax Association.	Rutgers University and the Urban-Brookings Tax Policy Center
2020	David Wildasin	One of the "most widely-cited economists" in the field of “open-economy” public economics.	University of Kentucky
2019	Louis Kaplow	Wrote the book The Theory of Taxation and Public Economics, and is amongst the most often-cited scholars in the field of public economics.	Harvard Law School
2018	Michael J. Keen	Played "a central role in shaping and delivering IMF policies," including advice to finance ministries in over 40 countries.	International Monetary Fund
2017	James R. Hines Jr.	Wrote the first comprehensive treatises on tax havens, now considered the foundation of all tax haven research.	University of Michigan
2016	Alvin C. Warren Jr.	Made "fundamental contributions on many important topics in tax policy...including progressive expenditure taxation and the integration of corporate and individual income taxes.”	Harvard Law School
2015	William D. Andrews	Wrote the article “A Consumption-Type or Cash Flow Personal Income Tax”, which generally regarded as the genesis for the concept of the consumption tax as a replacement for the income tax.	Harvard University
2014	James M. Poterba	President of the National Bureau of Economic Research, who conducted seminal research on how taxation affects the economic decisions of households and firms.	Massachusetts Institute of Technology and the National Bureau of Economic Research
2013	Michael Graetz	Highly influential expert on national corporate tax and international tax law.	Columbia University, Yale University, and the US Department of Treasury
2012	Joel Slemrod	One of the leading scholars, researchers, and authors in the field of personal income tax.	University of Michigan and the US Council of Economic Advisers
2011	Alan J. Auerbach	Creator of the destination-based cash flow tax.	University of California, Berkeley and the United States Congressional Joint Committee on Taxation
2010	Henry J. Aaron	Seminal contributor to the theory, implementation, and usage of social insurance.	Social Security Advisory Board and the Brookings Institution
2009	Peter Mieszkowski	Helped pioneer the "negative income tax" and a “new view” of the property tax that is still the primary source of own-revenues for local governments in the United States.	Rice University
2008	Walter Hellerstein	Author the leading treatise on state taxation, State Taxation vols. I-III, 3d ed., and of the leading casebook on state and local taxation, State and Local Taxation.	University of Georgia Law School
2007	Harvey S. Rosen	Contributed greatly to welfare analysis and the measurement of excess burden.	US Department of Treasury and Princeton University
2006	Richard M. Bird	Canadian professor and economic consultant who published extensively. Visiting professor in dozens of institutions around the globe.	University of Toronto and Harvard University
2005	Roy W. Bahl	Highly influential professor and scholar in fiscal decentralization. Served as an advisor for many developing governments.	University of West Virginia, The International Monetary Fund, Syracuse University, and Georgia State University
2004	Charles E. McLure	As the Deputy Assistant Secretary of the Treasury under President Ronald Reagan McLure was responsible for developing the Treasury Department's proposals that became the basis of the Tax Reform Act of 1986.	Rice University, The University of Chicago, The United States Department of the Treasury, and The Hoover Institute
2003	Martin Feldstein	President of The National Bureau of Economic Research from 1977-2008. Pioneered the use of data collected from household surveys and corporate databases to study a wide range of questions in public policy.	Harvard University and The National Bureau of Economic Research
2002	Wallace E. Oates	Published the highly influential novel Fiscal Federalism (1972), defining the research agenda of local public economics.	University of Maryland and Princeton University
2001	Arnold Harberger	Inventor of the Harberger's triangle.	University of Chicago and University of California, Los Angeles
2000	John F. Due	Highly influential tax scholar who published 13 books and numerous articles in the fields of taxation, transportation, economic theory and public finance.	University of Illinois Urbana-Champaign
1999	Oliver Oldman	Directed Harvard's International Tax Program from 1964-1989, teaching many who would go on to administer the tax regimes of nations around the globe.	Harvard Law School
1998	C. Lowell Harriss	Published seminal work on taxation of land, property tax, finance reform, land values and planning land use.	Columbia University
1997	Richard B. Goode	Directed the Fiscal Affairs Department of the International Monetary Fund from 1965-1981, and served as a highly influential consultant to the UN and the US National Treasury.	International Monetary Fund and Baylor University
1996	George Break	Conducted influential empirical research on the effects of income taxation on work incentives, intergovernmental relations, and tax reform.	University of California, Berkeley
1994	Richard Abel Musgrave	Published The Theory of Public Finance (1959), the first major English-language public finance treatise.	University of Michigan
1993	Carl Shoup	Intellectual father of the VAT tax. Contributed to the creation of the tax codes of Canada, the United States, Japan, Europe, and South and Central America.	Columbia University
