= Thomas MaCurdy =

American economics professor

Academic background
- Education: University of Chicago (PhD)
- Thesis: Two Essays on the Life Cycle (1978)

Academic work
- Doctoral students: Jay Bhattacharya; A. Colin Cameron; Hilary Hoynes

Thomas E. MaCurdy is an American professor of economics and a senior fellow at the Stanford Institute of Economic Policy Research and the Hoover Institution. He is a fellow of the Econometric Society and the Society of Labor Economics.
