= Louis Kaplow =

American legal scholar

Louis Kaplow (born June 17, 1956) is an American legal scholar and economist. He is the Finn M. W. Caspersen and Household International Professor of Law and Economics at Harvard Law School. He has made contributions to antitrust law, competition policy, intellectual property, and tax policy. Kaplow previously served as the president of the American Law and Economics Association, received its Coase Medal for major contributions to the field, and also received the Daniel M. Holland Medal for lifetime achievement from the National Tax Association.

== Education ==
Kaplow attended Northwestern University, completing a senior honors thesis and graduating in 1977 with a Bachelor of Arts (B.A.) in mathematics and economics as a member of Phi Beta Kappa. He then enrolled at Harvard Law School, where he was the managing editor of the Harvard Law Review, and obtained a Juris Doctor (J.D.), magna cum laude, in 1981. Kaplow continued graduate studies at Harvard University and received a Master of Arts (M.A.) in 1981 and a Doctor of Philosophy (Ph.D.) in 1987, both in economics, as a fellow of the National Science Foundation.

== Career ==
From 1981 to 1982, Kaplow was a law clerk to Judge Henry Friendly of the United States Court of Appeals for the Second Circuit. He gained admission to the bar of Massachusetts in 1983.

Kaplow was an assistant professor at Harvard Law School from 1982 to 1987 and is the associate director of the John M. Olin Center for Law, Economics, & Business. He was elevated to a full professorship in 1987, and served as the associate dean for research between 1989 until 1991. He received the university's appointment as the Finn M.W. Caspersen & Household International Professor of Law & Economics in 2004. According to the Social Science Research Network, Kaplow was one of the most-cited law professors of all time.

Kaplow is a research associate at the National Bureau of Economic Research. He was elected a fellow of the American Academy of Arts and Sciences in 2003. In 2019, Kaplow was awarded the Daniel M. Holland Medal of the National Tax Association.

== Selected publications ==
=== Books ===
- Kaplow, Louis; Shavell, Steven (2009). Fairness Versus Welfare. Harvard University Press. ISBN 9780674039315.
- Kaplow, Louis (December 5, 2010). The Theory of Taxation and Public Economics. Princeton University Press. ISBN 978-0691148212.
- Kaplow, Louis (June 30, 2013). Competition Policy and Price Fixing. Princeton University Press. ISBN 9781400846078.
