= William Harold Hutt =

English economist (1899–1988)

- Born: 3 August 1899; London
- Died: 19 June 1988 (aged 88); Irving, Texas

Academic background
- Education: London School of Economics
- Influences: Edwin Cannan

Academic work
- Discipline: Economics
- School or tradition: Neoclassical economics

William Harold Hutt (3 August 1899 – 19 June 1988) was an English economist who described himself as a classical economist.

== Early life ==
Hutt was born into a working-class, but educated, family in London, where his father was a compositor. After he completed high school during the height of the First World War, he began training as a pilot, but abandoned his training at the end of the war.

== Education ==
Hutt attended the London School of Economics (LSE) where he earned a Bachelor of Commerce degree under the "leading influence" of Edwin Cannan. After his 1924 graduation from LSE, Hutt worked for a publisher until 1927. It was during this period that Hutt wrote his first published essay, entitled "The Factory System of the Early Nineteenth Century" (1926).

== Professional career ==
Rather than wholly removing himself from academia upon the completion of his undergraduate degree, Hutt remained immersed in the LSE culture, attending LSE classes informally until March 1928, when he accepted a position as senior lecturer at the University of Cape Town (UCT), South Africa. In 1930, Hutt was promoted to "Chair of Commerce" at UCT. Later, Hutt would be named "Dean of the Faculty of Commerce."

In his writings on collective bargaining, including his first book, The Theory of Collective Bargaining (1930), Hutt disputed the commonly held position that labor was at a disadvantage in bargaining with employers, an idea which some had used to justify organized violence by trade unions. He also argued against the idea that the labor market consists of a "bilateral monopoly." Hutt argued that Collective Bargaining could lead to mass unemployment and rested on state intervention (for example the British Act of Parliament of 1875), and that picketing was a para military practice that amounted to legalised obstruction of the entrance of a place of business. Although Hutt argued vehemently against what he considered to be injustices committed by trade unions, he did not advocate their outright abolition. According to Australian writer Rafe Champion, Hutt believed that,

[Unions] had (and have) many useful functions in addition to acting as friendly societies for health and welfare provision. They could help their members to improve their qualifications and locate the best paid work, and they could provide assistance to members subjected to unfair treatment by management.

Hutt later became known as a leading voice in the academic community condemning South African apartheid. He vehemently objected to the policy, arguing in his 1964 critique, The Economics of the Colour Bar, that it was little more than a means by which white labor unions used the government to outlaw black competition. However, he did not support universal equal suffrage, instead arguing that "it would be absolutely essential to renounce the principle of universal suffrage on a common roll and accept some form of weighted franchise.". Hutt observed that groups that groups that grumble about injustice or oppression from other groups can frequently be found analogous injustices on others; he cited the case of Afrikaners complaining about British imperialism while discriminating against blacks.

He was a member of the Mont Pelerin Society and of the Philadelphia Society. Hutt's work has been notably praised by George Selgin and Nobel laureate James M. Buchanan.

In his 1936 book "Economists and the Public" he coined the now famous concept "consumer sovereignty". His papers are archived at the Universidad Francisco Marroquín in Guatemala City.

== Publications ==
- Hutt, W. H. (March 1926). "The Factory System of the Early 19th Century". Economica (16): 78–93. doi:10.2307/2548551. JSTOR 2548551.
- The Theory of Collective Bargaining. 1930 – via Internet Archive.
- Economists and the Public: A Study of Competition and Opinion. London: Jonathan Cape. 1936 – via Internet Archive.
- The Theory of Idle Resources (1939)
- Plan for Reconstruction: A Project for Victory in War and Peace. London: Kegan Paul, Trench, Trubner & Co., Ltd. 1943 – via Internet Archive.
- Hayek, F. A., ed. (1954). "The Factory System of the Early 19th Century". Capitalism and the Historians. Chicago: The Chicago University Press. pp. 160 - 188 – via Internet Archive.
- Keynesianism Retrospect and Prospect: A Critical Restatement of Basic Economic Principles (1963)
- The Economics of the Colour Bar: A Study of the Economic Origins and Consequences of Racial Segregation in South Africa (1964)
- Politically Impossible...? (1971)
- The Strike-threat System: The Economic Consequences of Collective Bargaining (1973)
- A Rehabilitation of Say's Law (1974)
- Pejovich, Svetozar; Klingaman, David, eds. (1975). Individual Freedom: Selected Works of William H. Hutt. Westport, Connecticut; London, England: Greenwood Press – via Internet Archive.
- The Keynesian Episode: A Reassessment (1979)
