= Joel Waldfogel =

American economist and the Frederick R (born 1962)

- Born: November 25, 1962 (age 63)
- Education: Brandeis University; Stanford University
- Awards: Journal of Urban Economics Highly Cited Author Award (2004-2008)
- Scientific career
- Fields: Economics
- Institutions: Yale University; University of Pennsylvania; University of Minnesota
- Thesis: Essays on the economics of criminal sentencing (1990)

Joel Waldfogel is an American economist and the Frederick R. Kappel Chair in Applied Economics at the University of Minnesota's Carlson School of Management.

== Education and career ==
Waldfogel grew up in South Minneapolis, Minnesota, where he attended Washburn High School. He then attended Brandeis University, where he received his B.A. in economics in 1984. He received his Ph.D. from Stanford University in 1990, also in economics. Before joining the University of Minnesota in 2010, he was the Ehrenkranz Family Professor of Business and Public Policy at the Wharton School of the University of Pennsylvania from 2003 to 2010. From 2006 to 2009, he was the chair of Wharton's Business and Public Policy Department, and he served as the associate vice dean for their doctoral program from 2000 to 2005. From 1990 to 1997 he was an Assistant Professor (and then Associate Professor) at the Yale School of Management.

== Public recognition ==
Waldfogel's research has proven controversial. His work on the economics of Christmas gift-giving led to him being called "the stupid professor, Mr. Waldfogel" by radio host, Rush Limbaugh.

His earlier work, ranking business schools while still an assistant professor (untenured) at the Yale School of Management, which located his school at dead last out of 63 schools in terms of rate of return, purportedly caused his dean to comment that MBA students at Yale were smarter than Professor Waldfogel.

== Books ==
- The Tyranny of the Market (Harvard University Press, 2007)
- Scroogenomics (Princeton University Press, 2009)
- Digital Renaissance: What Data and Economics Tell Us about the Future of Popular Culture (Princeton University Press, 2018)
