= YouCut =

2010 American political program

YouCut was a program started by Republican Congressman and House Majority Leader Eric Cantor in May 2010 to present ideas for potential cost-cutting bills to be presented to the House of Representatives of the United States, and to solicit feedback on those ideas from the public.

Cantor defended the program, stating that the goal is "to change the culture in Washington".

== See also ==
- Tax choice
