= Nancy Altman =

American Social Security advisor

Nancy Altman is an American lawyer, educator, and Social Security Advisory Board member. She is president of Social Security Works.

== Education ==
Altman has an AB from Harvard University and a JD from the University of Pennsylvania Law School.

== Career ==
Altman was a tax lawyer with Covington & Burling. She was a legislative assistant to John Danforth.

Altman was Alan Greenspan's assistant on the Commission that created the 1983 Amendments to Social Security.

She taught at Harvard Kennedy School.

Altman was appointed to the Social Security Advisory Board in 2017 and reappointed in 2024.

She is a founding board member of the National Academy of Social Insurance.

== Books ==
- The Battle for Social Security: From FDR’s Vision to Bush’s Gamble (2005)
- Social Security Works! Why Social Security Isn’t Going Broke and How Expanding It Will Help Us All (2015) with Eric R. Kingson
- The Truth About Social Security: The Founders’ Words Refute Revisionist History, Zombie Lies, and Common Misunderstandings (2018)
