= Jane Cannan =

Anglo-Australian artist (1822–1861)

- Born: Jane Dorothea Claude; 1822; England
- Died: 1861 (aged 38–39); Madeira
- Known for: Artist

Jane Cannan (1822–1861) was an Anglo-Australian artist.

== Life and work ==
Born Jane Dorothea Claude in 1822 of Berlin Huguenot descent, she grew up in Liverpool and Ambleside in England's Lake District and was a charity worker and school teacher. In 1853, Jane married David Cannan, a clerk for the firm Morewood & Rogers, which manufactured corrugated and galvanized iron products and portable iron buildings. Jane Cannan and her husband sailed to Melbourne, Australia, where her husband was the firm's agent for four years.

Jane Cannan's drawings of Melbourne townscapes and buildings are significant Australian historical records. Jane Cannan had three children: Louisa, who died in Melbourne as an infant, Charles Cannan who became an Oxford don, and Edwin Cannan who became a professor at the London School of Economics. Cannan is the grandmother of the novelist Joanna Cannan and the poet May Wedderburn Cannan.

Cannan died at the age of 38 of tuberculosis in Madeira, Portugal 18 days after her son Edwin was born. Cannan's sketchbooks and letters are part of the collections of the National Library of Australia in Canberra, the Royal Historical Society of Victoria in Mitchell, and Trinity College, Oxford.
