= GP Fundholding =

1990s British healthcare scheme

GP Fundholding was created in 1991 as part of the quasi-market created in the National Health Service by the Thatcher Government's National Health Service and Community Care Act 1990. Individual general practices were given control over some of the budgets for hospital care for their patients. This enabled them to change hospital practices by, in some cases, getting hospital consultants to run sessions outside hospital.

The Audit Commission claimed in 1993 that the pendulum had swung too far in favour of GPs who wished to pursue their own interests as there was no mechanism to get them to support national objectives. Some of the first wave of fundholders ended the year with surpluses in excess of £100,000. Five had surpluses of £200,000. On the other hand, the Sheffield Far Lane Medical Centre was stripped of fundholding status after running up a £100,000 deficit and placing a block on the referral of patients with non-urgent conditions. The Commission wanted to see commissioning organised more cost-effectively by district and family health service authorities carrying out joint commissioning, but involving GPs in decision-making.

Fundholding was abolished by the Labour Government in 1997/8 because of concerns that it helped to foster a two-tier health service. The scheme did not survive long enough to permit proper evaluation. As Rudolf Klein says "We rarely allow enough time to evaluate pilot, let alone national, policies". but it enabled the incoming government to introduce primary care groups — "thereby universalising fundholding while repudiating the concept."

Research by Dr Russell Mannion at the University of York identified some benefits of the scheme:

- Reduced rates of referrals to hospitals for electives
- Fewer emergency-related bed days
- Quicker waiting time for emergency treatment
- Better co-ordination between primary and community support services
- More GP engagement in developing care pathways

and some disadvantages:

- Less patient satisfaction
- Greater costs for management and transactions
- Reduced coordination between organisations, with reduction in shared care delivery
