= The Tyranny of the Market =

2007 book by Joel Waldfogel

- First edition
- Author: Joel Waldfogel
- Subject: Business
- Publisher: Harvard University Press
- Publication date: October 15, 2007
- Publication place: United States
- Media type: Print
- ISBN: 0-674-02581-4
- OCLC: 77716813
- Dewey Decimal: 381 22
- LC Class: HF5415.32 .W35 2007

The Tyranny of the Market is a book written by then-Wharton School of Business professor Joel Waldfogel. According to Forbes the book "makes the case that while markets do a good job of providing products that a majority of people demand, they can fall short of meeting the needs of consumers with less prevalent preferences."

== See also ==
- Scroogenomics – also written by Waldfogel
