= A. Colin Cameron =

Australian economist (born 1956)

- Born: September 13, 1956 (age 70)

Academic background
- Education: Australian National University (BEc); Stanford University (MS, PhD)
- Thesis: Youth Earnings and Work Experience (1987)
- Doctoral advisor: Thomas MaCurdy

Adrian Colin Cameron (born 13 September 1956) is an Australian economist. He is a professor of economics at University of California, Davis. Cameron is known for his graduate-level textbook Microeconometric Methods and Applications, co-authored with Pravin K. Trivedi.

Cameron graduated with a PhD in economics from Stanford University in 1988.
