= Walter Hellerstein =

American legal scholar

Walter Hellerstein (born June 21, 1946) is an American legal scholar. He is a distinguished research professor at the University of Georgia School of Law, where he is also the Francis Shackelford Distinguished Professor in Taxation Law Emeritus.

== Early life and education ==
Hellerstein was born on June 21, 1946, in New York City. He attended Harvard University, graduating with a Bachelor of Arts in government, magna cum laude, in 1967 with membership in Phi Beta Kappa. Hellerstein then enrolled at the University of Chicago Law School, receiving his Juris Doctor, cum laude, in 1970 as a member of the Order of the Coif. He was the editor-in-chief of the University of Chicago Law Review.

After law school, Hellerstein served in the United States Air Force from 1970 to 1976, achieving the rank of captain.

== Career ==
From 1970 to 1971, Hellerstein was a law clerk to Judge Henry Friendly of the United States Court of Appeals for the Second Circuit. He was in private practice at the law firm of Covington & Burling in Washington, D.C., from 1973 to 1975. From 1976 to 1978, he taught at the University of Chicago Law School.

Between January 1976 to August 1978, Hellerstein was an assistant professor of law at the University of Chicago. In September 1978, he became an associate professor at the University of Georgia School of Law. In 1999, he received the university's appointment as its Francis Shackelford Distinguished Professor in Taxation Law, then as a Distinguished Research Professor of the University of Georgia in 2011. He is a visiting professor at the Institute for Austrian and International Tax Law at the Vienna University of Economics and Business. He retired from teaching at the law school in 2015.

In 2008, Hellerstein was awarded the Daniel M. Holland Medal of the National Tax Association for "outstanding lifetime contributions to the study and practice of public finance".

Hellerstein is a life member of the American Law Institute.
