= David Wildasin =

American economist

- Education: B.A., University of Virginia (1972); Ph.D., University of Iowa (1976)
- Occupation: Economist
- Employer(s): Martin School, University of Kentucky
- Title: William T. Bryan Endowed Professor in Public Finance Emeritus
- Awards: Daniel M. Holland Medal (2020)

David Wildasin is an American economist, currently the William T. Bryan Endowed Professor in Public Finance Emeritus at Martin School, University of Kentucky, and also a published author. In 2020, Wildason was awarded the Daniel M. Holland Medal by the National Tax Association in recognition for lifetime achievement in taxation and public finance.

== Education ==
- Ph.D., University of Iowa, 1976. Dissertation title: "Theoretical Issues in Local Public Finance" (Thomas Pogue, principal adviser)
- B.A., University of Virginia, 1972
