= Indiana Choice Scholarships =

The State of Indiana school voucher movement, known as Indiana Choice Scholarships, was created to address the failings in the public education system. It is the largest school voucher program in the United States.

The movement to offer school vouchers was promoted as a way to allow underprivileged students stuck in underachieving schools the opportunity to attend a private school. The plan has been both hailed and criticized as either the new dawn of education or the beginning of the end of public education in America.

The Indiana Choice Scholarship was started as a part of House Enrolled Act 1003-2011 (Public Law 92-2011). The program works by providing qualifying students with financial assistance to enroll in private schools through scholarships that help cover the cost of school.

Many opponents of the voucher program say that the program is unconstitutional because of the constitutional right of separation of church and state. Many proponents of the voucher program, both in Indiana and at the national level, say that voucher programs benefit both public and private schools.

There have been many studies on the impact of the Indiana Choice Program Scholarship. Short-term studies have shown some benefit to the voucher programs in Indiana. Some Long-term studies have shown no improvement for students or even a backwards improvement for some students and no improvement for public schools in Indiana.

== History and future ==
In 2011, the initial school voucher program in Indiana passed while Mitch Daniels was governor. In 2013, the Indiana General Assembly passed HB 1003, which amended the school voucher program by creating tax credits for those already enrolled in private school and expanding voucher eligibility. Mike Pence was the governor at the time and supported the changes.

During the 2016-2017 school year, the voucher program saw 34,299 students going to 313 different schools. These voucher students accounted for twenty percent of the voucher students in the United States. During this school year, the voucher program families, both low-income and middle-class, were able to qualify for some sort of aid. Indiana also has no cap on how many students can be enrolled in the voucher program

As of January 2025, the Indiana Choice Scholarship has 70,000 students and is the largest voucher program in the country. The program saw a thirty-two percent growth in the past year.

In the future, the Republican Caucus of the Indiana House of Representatives hopes to expand the Indiana Choice Scholarship by getting rid of the income cap to qualify for vouchers.

== Study findings ==
=== Short-term studies ===
Short-term studies are the most reliable way to study the effects of the Indiana Scholarship of Choice because the program has only been around for fourteen years. Overall, short-term studies have shown little to no improvement for most students. Short-term studies have shown there are no improvements or backwards improvements for students who are enrolled in voucher programs.

=== Long-term studies ===
Long-term effects of the voucher program have not been studied enough to draw any conclusions. More studies and data need to be done to draw any conclusions about the long-term effects for students, schools, and the education system in the long term

While there have not been a great deal of studies done on the long-term effects of voucher programs, recent studies have shown little to no effects for students. Long-term studies show that while not affecting test scores, voucher programs do increase graduation rates of African American students if they attend a Catholic high school.

== Proponents of the voucher program ==
Those who support the voucher program point to the exponential growth of the program. In the 2011–12 school year, 9,324 students were enrolled in the states voucher program making it one of the largest in the country. As of 2023-2024, the program has an enrollment of 70,095 students. The Indiana Choice Scholarship program remains one of the largest voucher programs in the United States.

Proponents of the Indiana Choice Scholarship program believe that the voucher program is benefiting public schools because it forces public schools to compete with private schools and charter schools, and then, in turn, forces the public schools to become better.

Proponents of the Indiana Choice Scholarship cite that the voucher program improves student showing lower failing and suspension rates as evidence of its success.

== Opponents of the voucher program ==
While a choice in school may be favored by many, there are those who do not like the idea. Supporters of public schools say the program undermines the foundation of the public school system, citing disabilities concerns, financial barriers, divisions, and a lack of improvement. Opponents They also point to the irony that schools are expected to fix their shortfalls while losing money from the students who depart for private schools.

People are critical of the Indiana Choice Scholarship because of the lack of disability accommodations. Private schools do not have to accommodate 504 plans, some disabilities, and IEPs (Individualized Education Program). This lack of accommodation hurts students who attend public schools because accommodations are usually one of the first things to be cut in school budgets.

The Indiana Choice Scholarship was created to help students who could not otherwise afford private school and escape their bad public school. Critics of the voucher program make the argument that a lot of children using the program are already going to private schools to begin with. Proponents say that the average student is already attending private schools; therefore, the voucher program is helping middle-class families.

Another critic of the voucher program is that while the goal of the program is to help students attend the school of their choosing by providing monetary support, often, not enough monetary support is provided. Opponents say this leaves the most vulnerable students behind, because they cannot close the gap between what would be covered by the voucher and the private school tuition; thus, some students are left behind in failing public schools.

Critics of the voucher program are also cautious of the program because private schools can defer students based on their religion, gender, and ability to a certain extent. Whereas public schools are required to educate anyone who wants to be educated.

The argument has also been made that vouchers challenge the First Amendment Right that separates church and state. Cases have been brought to the courts questioning whether giving taxpayer money to religious schools goes against the First Amendment Right. The courts have ruled that it does not, but this is still a question plaguing people and is being challenged.

An argument often made by voucher program supporters is that students do better at private schools using voucher schools than they would have done at public schools, but data shows that there is no improvement or backward improvement for students, as shown by test scores.

Due to the lack of evidence that voucher programs work, an argument has been made that voucher programs are a way for republican lawmakers to push conservative agendas. When using a voucher program, most students attend a religious school. These religious schools are more conservative, so the hope is that the child will come out of school with conservative leanings.
