= Pravin K. Trivedi =

Pravin K. Trivedi is noted micro-econometrician. He holds a Distinguished Professor Emeritus and J. H. Rudy Professor Emeritus at Indiana University-Bloomington. His main research interest has been applying microeconometrics to "health econometrics" where attention is paid to roles of incentives in health related insurance and use of health care. He is most known for his textbook Microeconometrics: methods and applications written with A. Colin Cameron.

Between 2000 and 2007 he served as Co-Editor of the Econometrics Journal.

== Selected publications ==
- Cameron, A. C., & Trivedi, P. K. (2010). Microeconometrics using stata (Vol. 2). College Station, TX: Stata press.
- Cameron, A. C., & Trivedi, P. K. (2005). Microeconometrics: methods and applications. Cambridge University Press.
- Trivedi, P. K., & Zimmer, D. M. (2007). Copula modeling: an introduction for practitioners. Foundations and Trends, Econometrics, 1(1), 1–111.
