= Martin School of Public Policy and Administration =

Public policy school at the University of Kentucky

Coordinates: 38°02′19.4″N 84°30′15.0″W

The James W. Martin School of Public Policy and Administration is the graduate school of public affairs at the University of Kentucky.

Located in Lexington, Kentucky, the Martin School prepares students for leadership in public service. The Martin School offers undergraduate degrees in public policy and graduate degrees in public administration and public policy.

== History ==
The Martin School is named for James W. Martin, public servant and distinguished scholar of government finance and economics. Originally named the James W. Martin Center, the school admitted its first class in 1976. The name was changed to the James W. Martin School of Public Administration in 1984. In 1985, the school was designated a "Center of Excellence" by the University of Kentucky. The name was officially changed in 1994 to the James W. Martin School of Public Policy and Administration to better reflect the scope of the school's academic and public service pursuits.

== Academics ==
The Martin School offers multiple degree programs and allows graduate students to tailor their experience by selecting an area of concentration, completing a 400-hour internship or practicum, and presenting a self-directed capstone project. Traditional Master's programs are two-year degrees and may be completed on a full or part-time basis. Beginning in the summer of 2013, one-year intensive MPA/MPP programs will also be offered.

The National Association of Schools of Public Affairs and Administration accredits the Master's of Public Administration.

In 2019, the Martin School announced it would begin offering an undergraduate degree in public policy beginning with a cohort in the fall of 2020. This would later be expanded in the fall of 2021 where the Martin School began offering a minor in public policy to undergraduate students attending the University of Kentucky.

=== Graduate degree programs ===
- MPA - Master of Public Administration
- MPP - Master of Public Policy
- MPFM - Master of Public Financial Management
- PhD - Doctor of Philosophy in Public Administration

=== Graduate certificate programs ===
- Global Health
- Transportation
- Environmental Systems
- Public Financial Management
- Nonprofit Management

=== Concentrations ===
There currently are ten areas of concentration available to students. These are:

- Economic Development
- Education Policy
- Environmental Policy
- Gerontology
- Health Policy
- International Policy and Management
- Non-Profit Management
- Policy Analysis
- Transportation Systems Management

=== Dual and joint degree programs ===
The Martin School offers dual and joint degrees with the College of Law (JD/MPA), College of Pharmacy (Pharm.D/MPA) and the College of Engineering (MPA/BS Engineering). The Pharm.D/MPA dual degree is the only program of its kind offered in the United States.

=== Accelerated degree program ===
The University Scholars Program allows students from the University of Kentucky, Georgetown College and Morehead State University to complete their bachelor's and master's degrees in five years.

=== Undergraduate degree programs ===
- BA - Public Policy
- Minor - Public Policy
