= Osama Al-Eissa =

Osama al-Eissa (born 1963) is a Palestinian writer.

== Life ==
He was born in Bethlehem in the refugee camp of Dheisha. He moved to Jordan as a young man, and pursued a career in journalism. He wrote for many newspapers, among them Asharq Al-Awsat, Al-Akhbar and Kul Al-Arab. He eventually rose to become editor-in-chief of the Al-Sada weekly and then the Ramallah-based journal Al-Hayat Al-Jadida.

As a writer, Osama has published many novels and short story collections, starting with his debut collection We, the Poor, Are Still the Most Capable of Love in 1984. Noted books include the award-winning novels Al Maskobiya (2010) and The Madmen of Bethlehem (2013). He has also worked extensively with other forms such as oral history and documentary films that primarily deal with the Palestinian experience, for example, the oral history work Tales from the Ground in Jerusalem.

His most recent novel The Seventh Sky of Jerusalem (2023) was nominated for the Arabic Booker Prize.

== Selected works ==
=== Novels ===
- Al-Maskubiya, 2010
- Madmen of Bethlehem, 2013
- The Last Kiss of Bethlehem, 2016
- The Rose of Jericho, 2017
- Cat of Beersheba” in 2017
- A Bridge Over the Jordan River, 2018
- The Seventh Sky of Jerusalem, 2023

=== Short story collections ===
- We, the Poor, Are Still the Most Capable People of Love, 1984
- The Mountainous Tenderness, 1985
- Sentiments of Longing and Sorrow, 2004
- The Messenger of God to the Beloved, 2017.
