= Nada Eissa =

American economist (born 1967)

Deputy Assistant Secretary of the Treasury for Economic Policy
- In office August 2005 – July 5, 2007
- President: George W. Bush
- Preceded by: Mark Warshawsky
- Succeeded by: Ted Gayer

Personal details
- Born: 1967 (age 58–59) Sudan
- Education: University of California, Berkeley (BA); Harvard University (MA, PhD)
- Website: Faculty website

Academic work
- Discipline: Public finance
- Institutions: University of California, Berkeley; Georgetown University
- Notable students: Adriana Kugler
- Awards: National Tax Association’s Outstanding Doctoral Dissertation in Government Finance and Taxation (1995)

Nada O. Eissa is an American economist who is an associate professor of Public Policy and Economics at Georgetown University and a Research Associate of the National Bureau of Economic Research (NBER). She was Deputy Assistant Secretary of the Treasury for Economic Policy (microeconomics) in 2005–2007.

== Education and early life ==
Eissa moved to the United States from Sudan at the age of 9. She earned degrees in economics from the University of California at Berkeley and from Harvard University.

== Career ==
Eissa has been a member of the economics faculty at the University of California, Berkeley, a visiting scholar at the International Monetary Fund, a visiting scholar at the American Enterprise Institute, and the lead academic for the International Growth Centre's programs in South Sudan and Uganda. Her early research focuses on the labor supply effects of tax reforms; in recent years she has studied tax compliance in developing countries and evaluating the impact of school finance reforms in the United States on student outcomes.

=== Selected works ===
- Eissa, Nada, and Jeffrey B. Liebman. "Labor supply response to the earned income tax credit." The quarterly journal of economics 111, no. 2 (1996): 605–637.
- Eissa, Nada, and Hilary W. Hoynes. "Behavioral responses to taxes: Lessons from the EITC and labor supply." Tax policy and the economy 20 (2006): 73–110.
- Eissa, Nada, and Hilary Williamson Hoynes. "Taxes and the labor market participation of married couples: the earned income tax credit." Journal of public Economics 88, no. 9-10 (2004): 1931–1958.
- Eissa, Nada, Henrik Jacobsen Kleven, and Claus Thustrup Kreiner. "Evaluation of four tax reforms in the United States: Labor supply and welfare effects for single mothers." Journal of Public Economics 92, no. 3-4 (2008): 795–816.
- Wolf, Patrick J., Brian Kisida, Babette Gutmann, Michael Puma, Nada Eissa, and Lou Rizzo. "School Vouchers and Student Outcomes: Experimental Evidence from W ashington, DC." Journal of Policy Analysis and Management 32, no. 2 (2013): 246–270.
