= Cream skimming =

Pejorative conceptual metaphor in economics

Cream skimming is a pejorative conceptual metaphor used to refer to the perceived business practice of a company providing a product or a service to only the high-value or low-cost customers of that product or service, while disregarding clients that are less profitable for the company.

Whether or not the perceived negative effects of cream skimming actually do occur – or only occur in limited circumstances – is a matter of judgment and debate.

== Etymology ==
Milk being poured into a cream separator, which uses manual centrifugal force to separate out the cream.

The term derives from the practice of extracting cream from fresh milk at a dairy, in which a separator draws off the cream (which is lighter, and floats) from fresh or raw milk. The cream has now been "skimmed" or captured separately from the fresh milk.

The idea behind the concept of cream skimming in business is that the "cream" – high value or low-cost customers, who are more profitable to serve – would be captured by some suppliers (typically by charging less than the previous higher prices, but still making a profit), leaving the more expensive or harder to service customers without the desired product or service at all or "dumping" them on some default provider, who is left with less of the higher value customers who, in some cases, would have provided extra revenue to subsidize or reduce the cost to service the higher-cost customers, and the loss of the higher value customers might actually require the default provider to have to raise prices to cover the lost revenue, thus making things worse.

== Examples ==
The term has been used in relation to the concept of school vouchers in which it is claimed that the vouchers could be used by parents of "better" students (e.g., students with above average grades who are not disciplinary risks) to move them out of lower performing or substandard state schools and into less-crowded private ones, leaving the "worse" students (e.g., students with learning disabilities or who are troublemakers) behind in the state schools, making the situation worse.

The term was used in the United States the 1990s to describe a particular hypothetical scenario for the long-distance telephone service market. It was believed that MCI and Sprint long-distance telephone companies would end up taking away very high value business accounts (and some valuable residential accounts) from AT&T, leaving AT&T primarily with higher-cost-to-service accounts or accounts which produce less revenue (such as customers in less-densely populated or rural areas). This scenario would force AT&T to raise the price of their telephone services, meaning all customers of AT&T would end up paying more. This could conceivably have led to a vicious circle wherein more customers leave the high-price carrier for the lower priced carrier, thus forcing more price increases to cover the upward spiraling costs of providing service to a shrinking revenue base. This scenario did not occur, as various technological changes (spurred in part by the availability of competition) eventually lowered the net cost for most long-distance telephone calls.

The United States Postal Service has a monopoly on the delivery of "non-urgent" first-class mail, where delivery is not time-sensitive. It also has the exclusive right to use customer-owned mail boxes for placing the customer's mail for delivery. This means that, even though mail boxes, such as those in the door of a house, or on the curb, or in the front lobby of the customer's building, are owned by the customer, and not owned by the Postal Service, by law only the Postal Service may use them to deliver mail. This law is in effect because it is believed that were the Postal Service to not have this monopoly, other competing mail carriers would take over the most lucrative parts of the business (e.g. local delivery of bills in dense urban areas), leaving the Postal Service with more expensive urban deliveries and rural service.

== See also ==
- Redlining
