= Robert Blundell =

Australian cricketer

Personal information
- Born: 19 April 1896; Perth, Western Australia
- Died: 11 February 1940 (aged 43); Perth, Western Australia
- Source: Cricinfo, 14 July 2017

Robert Blundell (19 April 1896 – 11 February 1940) was an Australian cricketer. He played five first-class matches for Western Australia between 1921/22 and 1924/25. He died in 1940, aged 43, when a car he was travelling in along with three other persons crashed into a pole in Perth.
