= Wallace E. Oates =

American economist (1937–2015)

- Born: March 21, 1937
- Died: October 30, 2015 (aged 78)

Academic background
- Education: Stanford

Wallace E. Oates (March 21, 1937 – October 30, 2015) was a Distinguished University Professor of Economics at the University of Maryland.

He taught in the fields of public economics and environmental economics, and was considered a major international figure in both fields. His first book was Fiscal Federalism (1972) and he authored numerous other books and articles, including The Theory of Environmental Policy (1975), coauthored with William J. Baumol. A Festschrift, Environmental and public economics : essays in honor of Wallace E. Oates, was published in his honor in 1999, and an additional volume of his selected essays in 2004. Another Festschrift, The Tiebout Model at fifty: essays in public economics in honor of Wallace Oates was published in his honor in 2006.

He received his Ph.D. in economics at Stanford in 1965 and joined the faculty at Princeton University. He began at the University of Maryland in 1979. In 2002, he was awarded the Daniel M. Holland Medal for exceptional contribution to the field of taxation and public finance.

== Publications ==
- Ladd, Helen F., and Wallace E. Oates. Local Government Tax and Land Use Policies in the United States: Understanding the Links. Cheltenham, UK: Edward Elgar, 1998.
- Oates, Wallace E. The Economics of Fiscal Federalism and Local Finance. Northampton, MA: Edward Elgar, 1998.
- Oates, Wallace E. The Economics of Environmental Regulation. Cheltenham, U.K.: E. Elgar, 1996.
- Oates, Wallace E. Studies in Fiscal Federalism. Aldershot, Hants, England: E. Elgar, 1991.
- Baumol, William J., and Wallace E. Oates. The Theory of Environmental Policy. Cambridge [Cambridgeshire]: Cambridge University Press, 1988.
  - Translated into Spanish in 1982 as La teoría de la política económica del medio ambiente.
- Oates, Wallace E. The Economics of the Environment. Aldershot, Hants, England: E. Elgar, 1992. According to WorldCat, the book is held in 462 libraries
- Oates, Wallace E. Fiscal Federalism. New York: Harcourt Brace Jovanovich, 1972. According to WorldCat, the book is held in 595 libraries Reprinted, 2011
  - Translated into Spanish as Federalismo fiscal, 1977
- Baumol, William J., Wallace E. Oates, and Sue Anne Batey Blackman. Economics, Environmental Policy, and the Quality of Life. Englewood Cliffs, N.J.: Prentice-Hall, 1979.
- Oates, Wallace E. The Political Economy of Fiscal Federalism. Lexington, Mass: Lexington Books, 1977.
- Kelejian, Harry H., and Wallace E. Oates. Introduction to Econometrics; Principles and Applications. New York: Harper & Row, 1974.
  - Translated into Portuguese as Introdução a econometria principios e aplicações, 1978
  - Translated into Spanish as Introducción a la econometría : principios y aplicaciones in 1995
- McKinnon, Ronald I., and Wallace E. Oates. The Implications of International Economic Integration for Monetary, Fiscal, and Exchange-Rate Policy. Princeton, N.J.: International Finance Section, Dept. of Economics, Princeton University, 1966.
