= Scroogenomics =

Economics book

Scroogenomics: Why You Shouldn't Buy Presents for the Holidays
- Author: Joel Waldfogel
- Genre: Nonfiction
- Publisher: Princeton University Press
- Publication date: 2009
- Pages: 173
- ISBN: 978-0-69-114264-7
- OCLC: 310171808

Scroogenomics is a non-fiction book written by the economist Joel Waldfogel.

== Overview ==
In his book Waldfogel argues that purchasing gifts for other people is a "terrible way to allocate resources" as a result of gift givers' lack of knowledge of the recipients' true preferences. Waldfogel estimates that approximately $12 billion a year in the U.S. and $25 billion a year worldwide is misallocated in Yuletide giftgiving, which he calls "an orgy of wealth destruction".

== See also ==
- The Tyranny of the Market – also written by Waldfogel
