= Hometown tax =

Tax system in Japan

The hometown tax (ふるさと納税, furusato nōzei) is a system in Japan that allows taxpayers who live in urban areas to contribute to rural areas in return for a tax credit from income tax and residence tax. Its creation was announced by the Minister for Internal Affairs and Communications Yoshihide Suga under Prime Minister Shinzo Abe in 2007. In July 2014, Abe's then chief cabinet secretary Suga announced that they had established the preparatory office for the “local headquarters”.

The local headquarters was established to help increase the number of children, especially in rural areas, and to promote the development of self-governing bodies. Promoting “hometown tax” is included in these activities.

== History ==
In the spring of 2008 the "Hometown tax" law was legislated in Japan.

The hometown tax has undergone several revisions of the system and tightening of regulations over the years. By offering Amazon cards or travel tickets, some municipalities gain an advantage. In contrast, municipalities that honestly promote local products end up losing out. In 2019, the government changed its policy to reduce excess returns. Return gifts are strictly defined to be local products that contribute to the regional economy, and the percentage of the donation returned is limited to under 30%. Four municipalities that did not follow this instruction are excluded from this system. The government made two new modifications to this in 2023. They decided to limit municipalities’ expenses for collection and administrative tasks to no more than 50% for donation. Furthermore, aged meat and polished rice are accepted as return gifts if materials are produced within the same prefecture as the local government.

== Background ==
In Japan, many people are born and raised in their hometowns, receiving various public services, such as healthcare and education provided by municipalities. However, many of them move from their hometowns to cities for college or work and pay taxes there instead. As a result, tax revenue does not flow back to rural municipalities. This system was created to address this imbalance.

== Function background ==
Taxpayers who contribute more than 2,000 yen can have their income tax and residence tax reduced. The amount deducted is the taxpayer's entire contribution minus 2,000 yen and set amount. To receive the subtraction, the taxpayer files a final tax return. The reasoning is that many young people move to urban areas, leaving fewer people to pay rural taxes. Taxpayers choose the receiving jurisdiction.

== Critical reception ==
Cities that offered "gifts" of local products received up to 60 million yen.

The use of gifts has been criticized as distorting the results: for example, an effective donation of just 2,000 yen can net the donor 60 kg of rice, equivalent to one adult's annual consumption. Anything above the 2,000 yen is merely a redirection of the donor's tax from the central government to a regional government.

Cities that have no specialty products or have no means to announce their activity received fewer contributions.

== Yamagata prefecture ==
In Yamagata Prefecture, contributions have been increasing. For example, Obanazawa city and Mogami town received several million yen in 2013. They use gifts and the Internet to collect contributions. For example, Obanazawa, Yamagata offered gifts of “Obanazawa watermelon” and “sirloin steak of Obanazawa-gyū”.
