= Consumer sovereignty =

Economic consumer theory

Consumer sovereignty is the economic concept that the consumer has some controlling power over goods that are produced, and that the consumer is the best judge of their own welfare.

Consumer sovereignty in production is the controlling power of consumers, versus the holders of scarce resources, in what final products should be produced from these resources. It is sometimes used as a hypothesis that the production of goods and services is determined by the consumers' demand (rather than, say, by capital owners or producers).

Consumer sovereignty in welfare is the idea that the consumer is the best judge of their own welfare (rather than, say, politicians). It is used to claim that, for example, the government should help the poor by giving them monetary transfers, rather than by giving them products that are deemed "essential" by the politicians.

== Consumer sovereignty in production ==
Consumer sovereignty was first defined by William Harold Hutt as follows:

The consumer is sovereign when, in his role of citizen, he has not delegated to political institutions for authoritarian use the power which he can exercise socially through his power to demand (or refrain from demanding).

The double use of the word "power" in this definition makes it clear that the power of the consumers was the most important topic in the whole concept. Hutt later reformulated the definition in a similar sense:

...the controlling power exercised by free individuals, in choosing between ends, over the custodians of the community's resources, when the resources by which those ends can be served are scarce.

=== Examples ===
Sometimes a business will fail because it can't provide the products necessary to make consumers happy:

- Blockbuster ultimately failed because consumers started to adapt to more convenient alternatives like Netflix, Redbox, and video on demand. Blockbuster continued renting out DVDs and VHS tapes at traditional stores and was slow to modernize, causing Blockbuster to lose money and eventually go bankrupt.
- Dell, once the biggest computer manufacturer, faltered as mobile devices began to displace PCs, cheap Asian machines cut into profitability, and big customers began to demand end-to-end service in addition to the hardware.
- When other companies (such as Nikon and Canon) began making cameras that took digital photos unlike the film cameras from Kodak, consumers switched to these companies and eventually, Eastman Kodak went under.

=== Origins ===
The idea of primacy of consumption over production was first pronounced by Adam Smith in 1776:

Consumption is the sole end and purpose of all production; and the interest of the producer ought to be attended to, only so far as it may be necessary for promoting that of the consumer.

The term "consumer sovereignty" was first coined by William Harold Hutt in his book Economists and the Public: A Study of Competition and Opinion (1936). However, Hutt himself was always cautious of claiming credit for the term:

I am not sure whether I coined the term myself. Marketing literature contains phrases like "the customer is always right", and I am told that a proverbial expression in High Dutch is "De klant is koning" (the customer is king). I first used the term in its present sense in an unpublished article which I circulated in 1931. It first appeared in print, I believe, in an article which I published in March 1934. In 1935 Dr. W. Röpke used the phrase "democracy of the consumers"; and in the same year Professor F. A. Hayek used the phrase "sovereignty of the consumer" in a section heading in Collectivist Economic Planning. Since then the term seems to have been fairly widely employed.

Although Hutt did not mean to establish any theory based on this concept, some economists argue that consumer sovereignty does not hold in some cases, for example, in healthcare.

When the term was used for the first time by Hutt, it was written as "consumers' sovereignty". In the book's review by Jacob Viner, he used it as "consumer's sovereignty". Later, the term "consumer sovereignty" became generally used.

=== Consumers versus suppliers ===
To understand consumer sovereignty you must also understand consumers and their demand. Everyone is a consumer and demands not only products such as food, or commodities like oil or gas, but also production factors such as time, and all other possible things. When a worker wants to have more leisure time, his demand for leisure is confronted with the demand of the society for his work. Only after the worker outbids the society for his leisure, can he consume it as he wishes. According to Hutt, the poor understanding of consumers and their demand led to some of the early criticisms of this concept:

It seems to me that one basic misunderstanding is mainly responsible for all Professor Fraser's criticisms. He says that the "doctrine of consumers' sovereignty implies, perhaps even entails, that preferences on the side of demand are fundamentally and in principle more important than those on the side of supply." But all I have done is to make the concept correspond with the distinction between ends and means. As I have used the term, it covers the expression of all human preferences in respect of ends, in so far as those ends are confronted with scarce means. When ends are being sought, we are concerned with demand; when means are being chosen, we are concerned with an aspect of supply—entrepreneurship.

As Hutt also described, the concept therefore does not neglect suppliers:

This does not involve any "startling neglect," as Professor Fraser describes it, "of the producers' side of the picture." Every owner of resources (including his own physical powers) may be regarded as bidding, with the rest of the consumers, for the services of his own resources. We may regard him as normally offering part of those services for exchange, actual or anticipated bidding as a whole. He is, so to speak, outbid for such services by other consumers.

=== Criticism ===
The concept of consumer sovereignty has been criticized for not respecting a presumed symmetry between freedom to demand and freedom to supply. Although Hutt may be blamed for the misunderstanding of the critics, they have missed the point of the concept:

Recognizing that in some situations a producer might choose a less remunerative activity which that producer finds more personally satisfying, Hutt defined such a decision as one of consumption, not production. In doing so, he attempted to force the distinction between consumption and production to run exactly parallel to the distinction between ends and means.

Some economists viewed the effort to make the distinction between consumption and production parallel to the distinction between ends and means as an unfortunate exercise in wordplay.

Even if consumers are approached traditionally, they are largely sovereign under the assumption that in the role of producers, people maximize their income. Economists address this hypothesis also as consumer sovereignty.

This element supports society because consumers have the power to decide how a store is going to function and to increase or decrease sales - simply by buying things, consumers determine what goods are produced and how well they sell, and whether supply brings consumers to the market and whether new consumers will visit. It also brings competition between other markets because other markets might need to change the price on their goods in order to bring consumers back.

Views on the primacy of consumption can become matters of ideological debate in socialist economies - as happened in Poland in the 1940s.

=== Related concepts ===
- Consumers' co-operative is an enterprise owned and managed democratically by its consumers.
- Dollar voting is the impact of consumer choice on producers' actions through the flow of consumer payments to producers for their goods and services.
- Ethical consumerism is a process by which consumers deliberately try to influence the production process according to their moral values, for example by preferring ethical producers or boycotting non-ethical ones.
- Resource dependence theory is the theory that production depends on resources available from the environment, rather than just on consumers' demand.

== Consumer sovereignty in welfare ==
Consumer sovereignty is defined in the Macmillan dictionary of modern economics as:

The idea that the consumer is the best judge of his or her own welfare. This assumption underlies the theory of consumer behaviour and through it the bulk of economic analysis including the most widely accepted optimum in welfare economics, the Pareto optimum.

A more detailed definition was given by Abba P. Lerner:

The basic idea of consumer sovereignty is really very simple: arrange for everybody to have what he prefers whenever this does not involve any extra sacrifice for anybody else.… One of the deepest scars of my early youth was etched when my teacher told me, "You do not want that," after I had told her that I did. I would not have been so upset if she had said that I could not have it, whatever it was, or that it was very wicked of me to want it. What rankled was the denial of my personality—a kind of rape of my integrity. I confess I still find a similar rising of my hackles when I hear people's preferences dismissed as not genuine, because influenced or even created by advertising, and somebody else telling them what they "really want."

=== Empirical evidence ===
A possible way to test the consumer sovereignty assumption is to compare consumers' valuations of items they purchase on their own, to their valuations of items they receive as gifts from friends and family. In one such experiment, done during a holiday season, it was found that consumers value their own purchases about 18% more than the gifts they receive. This supports the consumer sovereignty assumption.

Another experiment compared the effects of two parallel government programs in Mexico, both intended to help poor villagers: the first provided cash transfers, and the second provided food transfers. The experiment found no evidence for the "paternalistic" view that in-kind transfers are better and that cash transfers induce consumption of unhealthy products. Since cash transfers are cheaper to carry out, a practical conclusion of this experiment is that it is better to help the poor by giving them cash transfers that they can use according to their subjective preferences.

=== Criticism ===
J. K. Galbraith claims that advertising distorts consumers' preferences, so consumers' revealed preferences actually represent what is good for the advertisers and not what is good for consumers themselves.

Lester Thurow claims that many consumers (e.g. children and drug-addicts) are not competent to know what is good for them. Moreover, even competent individuals have preferences that are partly influenced by society, and do not represent only their own wants.

Various studies show that consumers' preferences are irrational and inconsistent, and so they cannot represent what is actually good for them. This is true, in particular, for inter-temporal decisions (such as deciding how much to save for old age) and probabilistic decisions (such as assessing the risks of financial investments).

A practical implication of such criticisms is that governments should provide merit goods rather than lump-sum transfers.
