= Julian Le Grand =

Sir Julian Le Grand FBA
- Born: 29 May 1945 (age 81)
- Citizenship: United Kingdom

Academic background
- Education: University of Pennsylvania(DPhil)

Academic work
- Discipline: Economics
- Institutions: London School of Economics and Political Science
- Awards: Knighthood (UK); Fellow of the British Academy

Sir Julian Ernest Michael Le Grand, FBA FAcSS (born 29 May 1945) is a British economist and social policy scholar. He is a professor at the London School of Economics and Political Science (LSE), where he has held academic positions since 1993. His research has focused on economics, social policy, welfare-state institutions, health care, inequality, public-service provision, and the use of markets and choice in social services. He served as a senior policy adviser to Prime Minister Tony Blair from 2003 to 2005 and has advised British and international public institutions on social and health policy.

== Early life and education ==
He studied economics and subsequently completed a PhD in economics at the University of Pennsylvania. His academic training in economics informed his later work on social policy and the allocation of public resources.

Before joining the LSE, he held academic positions at the universities of Sussex and Bristol and taught at the University of California. His early research concerned the economics of social problems.

== Academic career ==
Le Grand joined the London School of Economics in 1993 and subsequently held the Richard Titmuss Professorship of Social Policy. He later became associated with the LSE's Marshall Institute.

His research has covered social policy, health economics, welfare economics, public-service provision, inequality, and political philosophy. Much of his work has considered how governments can organize public services while addressing competing objectives such as efficiency, equity, individual autonomy, and accountability. Among his early books was The Strategy of Equality: Redistribution and the Social Services (1982), which examined redistribution through public services. His later work included Equity and Choice: An Essay in Economics and Applied Philosophy (1991), which considered the relationship between distributive justice and individual choice.

=== Social policy and quasi-markets ===
An important component of Le Grand's academic work has concerned the use of market mechanisms within publicly funded welfare services. Together with Will Bartlett, he edited Quasi-Markets and Social Policy (1993), a collection examining arrangements in which public services remain publicly financed while providers compete for users or contracts.

Le Grand subsequently developed these ideas in relation to health care, education, and other public services. His 2007 book The Other Invisible Hand: Delivering Public Services through Choice and Competition examined the use of choice and competition as mechanisms for organizing public services.

His work on quasi-markets became influential in discussions surrounding reforms to British public services. He argued that public-service systems could incorporate elements of competition and user choice while retaining public financing and objectives relating to equity. His research also examined the limitations and potential risks of market mechanisms in welfare services. In 2026 his quasi-market work was identified as instrumental in greatly improving the military procurement process of drones by Ukraine in its war with Russia.

In Motivation, Agency and Public Policy: Of Knights and Knaves, Pawns and Queens (2003), Le Grand developed a framework for analyzing assumptions about human motivation in public policy. He distinguished between different conceptions of citizens and public-service workers and examined how institutional arrangements and incentives could influence behavior.

=== Health and social care policy ===
Health care has been a major subject of Le Grand's research. His work has examined the organization of the National Health Service (NHS), competition between providers, patient choice, rationing, and the relationship between efficiency and equity. With Bill New, he published Rationing in the NHS: Principles and Pragmatism in 1996. He also edited and contributed to studies examining the NHS internal market and subsequent reforms. His research considered whether competition could be reconciled with the NHS's objectives of universal access and equitable treatment. With Bill New, he examined the role of the state in promoting public health.

Le Grand was a trustee of the King's Fund from 2007 to 2016 and served on its Commission on Health and Social Care in 2013–2014. He has also served on health authorities, NHS working groups, and the Commission for Health Improvement.

=== Government adviser ===
From 2003 to 2005, Le Grand was seconded from the LSE to 10 Downing Street, where he served as a senior policy adviser to Prime Minister Tony Blair. His responsibilities included advising on social policy and public-service reform.

During this period and subsequently, Le Grand was associated with several policy initiatives involving education, health, social care, and public services. These included the development of the Child Trust Fund, proposals for Patient Budgets, Social Work Practices, and the Pupil Premium. The Child Trust Fund was a government savings scheme introduced in 2005 that provided children with a long-term savings account. The Pupil Premium was introduced in England in 2011 to provide additional funding to schools for pupils from disadvantaged backgrounds. Le Grand has been identified by the Institute for Fiscal Studies as the founder of this idea.

He subsequently chaired or participated in several government advisory groups. From 2007 to 2009, he chaired Health England's National Reference Group for Health and Well Being. From 2011 to 2013, he chaired the Cabinet Office's Mutuals Task Force, which examined the development of employee- and community-owned organizations providing public services.

In 2007, he chaired a working group on Social Work Practices for the Department for Education and Skills. In 2013 and 2014, he chaired panels reviewing children's services in Doncaster and Birmingham for the Department for Education.

=== International and public-sector advisory work ===
Le Grand has advised a number of international and British institutions on social and public policy. His advisory work has included the European Commission, World Bank, World Health Organization, Organisation for Economic Co-operation and Development, HM Treasury, and the Department for Work and Pensions. He has also served on research and policy bodies associated with the Economic and Social Research Council and held positions with organizations concerned with health care and social policy. His professional activities have included work on NHS governance, health economics, social exclusion, public-service reform, and welfare policy.

=== Public policy and political thought ===
A recurring theme in Le Grand's work is the relationship between government intervention and individual choice. His research has examined how welfare systems can promote equality while allowing individuals greater control over the services they receive.

His work on human motivation challenged assumptions that public servants and welfare recipients necessarily behave either altruistically or opportunistically. In Motivation, Agency and Public Policy, he used the terms "knights", "knaves", "pawns", and "queens" to describe different models of human behavior, public service motivation and agency in public policy.

Le Grand has also written on social exclusion, taxation, pensions, health inequalities, and the organization of welfare services. His research has therefore combined economic analysis with questions concerning ethics, political philosophy, and distributive justice.

=== Later work ===
Le Grand has continued to publish and participate in public-policy discussions through the LSE and other institutions. His later work has included research on behavioral public policy, social care, health policy, public-service organization, and the relationship between markets and welfare-state institutions. He has served on the editorial boards of the Journal of Behavioural Public Policy, Political Quarterly, and Health Economics, Policy and Law. He has also continued to write for newspapers and appear on radio and television programs discussing social and economic policy.

== Honours ==
Le Grand was elected a Fellow of the British Academy in 2012. He is also a founding Academician of the Academy of Social Sciences and an honorary fellow of the Faculty of Public Health Medicine.

He received an honorary Doctor of Letters from the University of Sussex in 2006 and an honorary doctorate from the University of Birmingham in 2018. In 2012, he received the Eupolis Prize for Public Policy from the Eupolis Institute in Milan.

In the 2015 New Year Honours, Le Grand was knighted for services to social science and public service.

== Personal life ==
In 1971 He married Damaris Robertson- Glasgow (died 2025). They have two daughters and five grandchildren.

== Works ==
- Le Grand, Julian; Propper, Carol; Robinson, Ray (1976). The economics of social problems. Houndmills: Macmillan. ISBN 978-0-333-55258-2.
- Le Grand, Julian (1982). The strategy of equality: redistribution and the social services. Allen & Unwin. ISBN 978-0-04-336074-3.
- Goodin, Robert E.; Grand, Julian Le (1987). Not Only the Poor: The Middle Classes and the Welfare State. Allen and Unwin. ISBN 978-0-429-48623-4.
- Le Grand, Julian; Estrin, Saul, eds. (1989). Market socialism. Oxford: Oxford University Press. ISBN 978-0-19-827701-9.
- Le Grand, Julian (1991). Equity and choice: an essay in economics and applied philosophy. London: HarperCollins Academic. ISBN 978-0-04-350065-1.
- Bartlett, Will; Le Grand, Julian, eds. (1993). Quasi-Markets and Social Policy. Houndmills: Macmillan. ISBN 978-1-349-22873-7.
- New, Bill; Le Grand, Julian (1996). Rationing in the NHS: principles and pragmatism. London: King’s Fund Publishing. ISBN 978-1-85717-113-6.
- Le Grand, Julian (2006). Motivation, agency, and public policy: of knights and knaves, pawns and queens (Revised Paperback ed.). Oxford: Oxford University Press. ISBN 978-0-19-926699-9.
- Le Grand, Julian (2007). The other invisible hand: delivering public services through choice and competition. Princeton: Princeton University Press. ISBN 978-0-691-12936-5.
- Le Grand, Julian; New, Bill (2015). Government paternalism: nanny state or helpful friend?. Princeton: Princeton University Press. ISBN 978-0-691-16437-3.
