= Social Security Advisory Board =

Board overview
- Formed: August 15, 1994
- Jurisdiction: Federal government of the United States
- Headquarters: Washington, D.C.
- Board executive: Amy Shuart, Chair
- Website: www.ssab.gov

The Social Security Advisory Board (SSAB) is an independent, bipartisan board of the United States federal government. It was created by Congress and is appointed by the President and the Congress to advise the President, the Congress, and the Commissioner of Social Security on matters related to the Social Security and Supplemental Security Income programs.

== History ==
In the United States in 1994, when Congress passed legislation establishing the Social Security Administration as an independent agency, it also created a seven-member bipartisan Board to advise the President, the Congress, and the Commissioner of Social Security on policies related to Social Security’s old-age, survivors, and disability insurance (OASDI) and Supplemental Security Income (SSI) programs. The legislation passed both Houses of Congress without opposition and President Clinton signed the Social Security Independence and Program Improvements Act of 1994 into law (P.L. 103-296) on August 15, 1994. The law took effect on March 31, 1995.

== Membership ==
The board consists of seven members. Three of these are appointed by the President, of which a maximum of two may be members of the same political party, by and with the advice and consent of the Senate. Two members, each of which shall be members of different political parties, are appointed by the President pro tempore of the Senate with the advice of the chairman and the ranking minority member of the Senate Committee on Finance. The remaining two members are appointed by the Speaker of the House of Representatives, with the advice of the chairman and the ranking minority member of the House Committee on Ways and Means, each of these shall also be members of different political parties.

By statute, the members "shall be chosen on the basis of their integrity, impartiality, and good judgment, and shall be individuals who are, by reason of their education, experience, and attainments, exceptionally qualified to perform the duties of members of the Board." They each serve terms of six years, and a member may not continue to serve after the end of their term. Four members is the minimum necessary for the board to have a quorum, of which only three may be members of the same political party. The President designates one of the members to serve as chairman. The term of the chairman is four years, coincident with the term of the President, or until the President designates another chairman.

=== Board members ===
The current board as of May 15, 2026:

Position	Name	Party	Appointed by	Took office	Term expires
Chair	Amy Shuart	Republican	Speaker of the House	October 7, 2022	October 7, 2028
Member	Nancy Altman	Democratic	Speaker of the House	September 26, 2017	June 21, 2030
Member	Jagadeesh Gokhale	Republican	President pro tempore of the Senate	November 19, 2009	September 28, 2027
Member	Bob Joondeph	Democratic	President pro tempore of the Senate	October 1, 2018	October 1, 2030
Member	Vacant		The President		
Member	Vacant		The President		
Member	Vacant		The President		
