= Gormley =

Surname

Gormley (modern Irish: Ó Garmaile) is an Irish surname. It is derived from the Gaelic Ó Goirmleadhaigh meaning 'descendant of Gormghal'. The main sept of the clan originated in Tyrconnell (present day County Donegal) and then spread into Tyrone. The Ulster branch of the clan were chiefs of the Cenél Moain and originated in what is now the barony of Raphoe in East Donegal, an area known in Gaelic times as Tír Moain. The common ancestor and progenitor of these Gormleys was Moain son of Muireadach, son of Eoghan, son of Niall of the Nine Hostages.

== Different septs and spellings ==
In the Annals of the Four Masters and in the Topographical Poems of O'Dugan and O'Heerin, the name is spelt Ó Goirmleadhaigh; the Annals of Loch Cé write it Ó Gormshuil and Ó Gormshuiligh: the editor (William Hennessy) writing in 1871 states that the latter was then anglicised O'Gormooly, but Gormley is universal today. The name means “blue spearman”.

In the Partry Mountains of County Mayo in the West of Ireland is found a sept also called Gormley, Gormaly and Gormilly. The Irish form of this family's name is Ó Goirmghialla or possibly Ó Gormghaille, both Irish forms meaning “blue hostage”. They were chiefs of this area along with the Darcy or Dorcey family. The present parish of Ballyovey, also called the parish of Party, shows the location of this ancient territory in Mayo. In the area of Lough Key, County Roscommon, we find families of the name (O') Gormaly or Gormally. O'Donovan says that these are quite distinct from the O'Gormleys of County Tyrone and that the Irish form of this name is Ó Garmghaile. It is likely that this family is of the same stock as the Mayo sept, but it is unclear if both are related to the main sept of Ulster.

In seventeenth century records they are found both as O'Gormley and Mac Gormley, located chiefly in counties Armagh and Londonderry in modern-day Northern Ireland, but also in County Roscommon and County Westmeath, Republic of Ireland. Gormleys today are chiefly found in County Tyrone, Northern Ireland, and surrounding areas.

== Notable Gormleys ==
- Andrew Gormley, American drummer for the band Rorschach
- Antony Gormley (born 1950), British sculptor
- Beatrice Gormley (born 1942), American children's writer
- Bob Gormley (1918–2003), U.S. soccer forward
- Brandon Gormley (born 1992), Canadian ice hockey player
- Charles Gormley (1937–2005), Scottish film director
- Conor Gormley (born 1980), Irish Gaelic footballer
- Eddie Gormley (born 1968), former Irish football player
- Enda Gormley (born 1966), Irish Gaelic footballer
- Francis Gormley (1899–1974), Irish politician
- Jody Gormley (1971–2024), Gaelic footballer for Tyrone, and London
- Joe Gormley (disambiguation), several people
- John Gormley (born 1959), Irish Green party politician
- John Kenneth Gormley (born 1957), Canadian broadcaster and former politician
- Joseph L. Gormley (1914–2004), chief of chemistry and toxicology for the FBI
- Ken Gormley, President of Duquesne University in Pittsburgh, Pennsylvania
- Ken Gormley, bass player from Australian band The Cruel Sea
- Kiera Gormley, Irish model
- Mark Gormley, singer-songwriter from Pensacola, Florida
- Mary Gormley, Irish beauty contestant
- Niall Gormley, Gaelic footballer in County Tyrone
- Paddy Gormley (1916–2001), Irish nationalist politician
- Patsy Gormley (1932–2022), Gaelic footballer in County Londonderry
- Phil Gormley (born 1963), former Chief Constable of Police Scotland
- Rowan Gormley (born 1962), South African-born entrepreneur
- Tad Gormley (1884–1965), former head of the New Orleans Gymnastics Club and Amateur Athletic Union
- Tom Gormley (1916–1984), politician in County Tyrone, served in the House of Commons of Northern Ireland
- Tom Gormley, American professional football player
- Tony Gormley (1962–1987), member of the Provisional Irish Republican Army (PIRA)
- William Gormley (born 1946), American politician from New Jersey
- William T. Gormley, professor of Government at Georgetown University
