= Center on Budget and Policy Priorities =

American political think tank

- Abbreviation: CBPP
- Formation: 1981; 45 years ago
- Type: Public policy think tank
- Headquarters: 1275 First St NE Suite 1200
- Location: Washington D.C.
- President: Sharon Parrott
- Revenue: $52.5 million (2024)
- Expenses: $48.6 million (2024)
- Website: www.cbpp.org

The Center on Budget and Policy Priorities (CBPP) is a progressive American think tank that analyzes the impact of federal and state government budget policies. A 501(c)(3) nonprofit organization, the organization's stated mission is to "advance federal and state policies to help build a nation where everyone — regardless of income, race, ethnicity, sexual orientation, gender identity, ZIP code, immigration status, or disability status — has the resources they need to thrive and share in the nation's prosperity."

CBPP was founded in 1981 by Robert Greenstein, a former political appointee in the Jimmy Carter administration. Greenstein founded the organization, which is based in Washington, D.C., to provide an alternative perspective on the social policy initiatives of the Ronald Reagan administration.

== Activities ==
Based in Washington, D.C., the Center was founded in 1981 by Robert Greenstein. In 2013, the Center reported revenue of $37.5 million, expenses of $27.3 million, and total year-end assets of $67.7 million.

In 1993, the Center was involved in the founding of the State Fiscal Analysis Initiative (SFAI), a network of nonprofit, state-level policy organizations that examine state budget and tax policies and their effect on low- and moderate-income households.

In 1997, the Center established the International Budget Partnership (IBP). The IBP publishes a biennial Open Budget Index which measures governmental budget transparency and accountability around the world.

In 2005, representatives of CBPP attended a May 2006 meeting of the Democracy Alliance along with the Center for American Progress and the Economic Policy Institute to "talk about the agendas they were busy crafting that would catapult Democratic politics into the economic future."

The Center is opposed to modern day efforts to call a convention to propose amendments to the United States Constitution.

== Political stance ==
The Center describes itself as "a nonpartisan research and policy institute" with a focus on reducing poverty and inequality. Others have described it as nonpartisan, progressive, liberal, and left-leaning.

== Board of directors ==
The organization's board of directors includes Henry J. Aaron, senior fellow, Brookings Institution; Mayra Alvarez, president, The Children's Partnership; Kenneth S. Apfel, emeritus professor at the University of Maryland; Henry A. Coleman, emeritus professor at Rutgers University; Lynn McNair, president of the Windward Fund; Robert Reischauer, president emeritus at the Urban Institute; Kim Wallace, senior managing director of 22V Research; David de Ferranti, director of International Initiative for Impact Evaluation; Maria Cancian, dean of the McCourt School of Public Policy at Georgetown University; James Jimenez, adjunct faculty at the University of New Mexico; Lili Lynton, operating partner at The Dinex Group; Ai-jen Poo, president of the National Domestic Workers Alliance; and Samantha Tweedy, CEO of the Black Economic Alliance.

== Staff ==
On March 23, 2018, employees formed a union with Nonprofit Professional Employees Union, which was voluntarily recognized. In 2023 a new collective bargaining agreement was reached.

== Funding ==
The Center is supported by a number of foundations, including the Annie E. Casey Foundation, the John D. and Catherine T. MacArthur Foundation, and the Ford Foundation, as well as individual donors. The Atlantic Philanthropies is a major donor to CBPP, as is George Soros. CBPP has received funding through the Democracy Alliance. In fiscal year 2012, it accepted $1,533,236 in government grants.

== See also ==
- Brookings Institution
- Democracy Alliance
- The Heritage Foundation
- Tax Foundation
- Urban Institute
