= List of multilingual presidents of the United States =

Presidents of the United States who spoke languages other than English

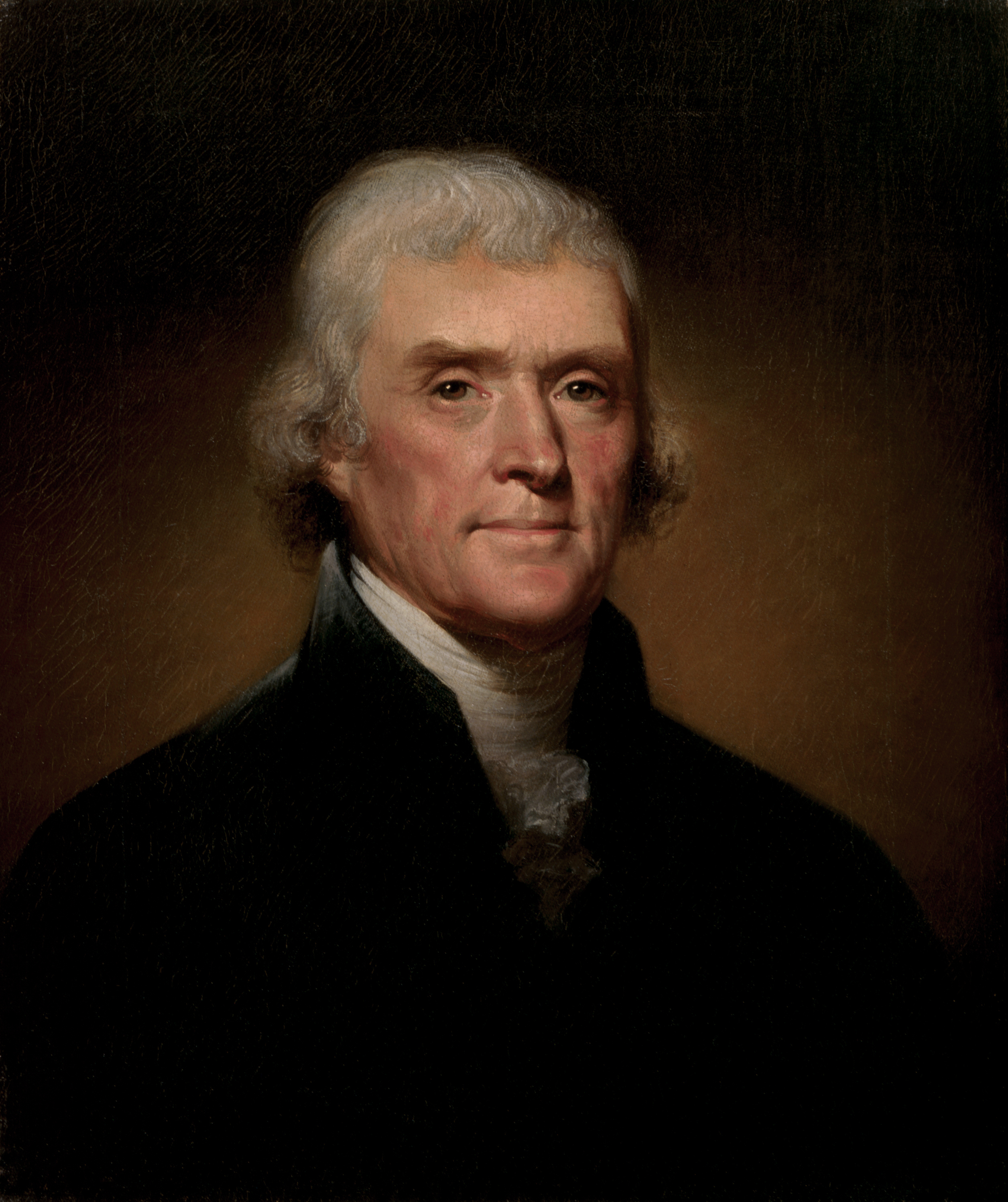
Thomas Jefferson claimed to read and write 6 different languages.

Of the 45 (Note: As of 2025. While there have been 47 presidencies, only 45 individuals have served as president as Grover Cleveland and Donald Trump have served nonconsecutive presidencies.) persons who have served as president of the United States, at least half have displayed proficiency in speaking or writing a language other than English. Of these, only one, Martin Van Buren, learned English as his second language; his first language was Dutch. Four of the earliest presidents were multilingual, with John Quincy Adams and Thomas Jefferson demonstrating proficiency in a number of foreign languages.

James A. Garfield and his successor Chester A. Arthur knew Ancient Greek and Latin; Garfield's ambidexterity would lead to rumors that he could write both at the same time. Both Theodore and Franklin D. Roosevelt spoke French, and Woodrow Wilson and Franklin D. Roosevelt spoke German. As for Asian languages, James Madison studied Hebrew, Herbert Hoover spoke some Mandarin Chinese, while Barack Obama spoke Indonesian fluently as a child.

== 18th century ==
=== John Adams ===
John Adams, the second president of the United States, learned to read Latin at a young age. In preparation for attending Harvard University, Adams attended a school for improving his Latin skills. While posted in France during the Revolutionary War, Adams became fluent in French.

== 19th century ==
=== Thomas Jefferson ===
Thomas Jefferson spoke and read multiple languages, which included French. According to notes he made while traveling in 1788, he was able to speak French, Latin, and Italian. He claimed to be able to read, as of 1817, these languages along with Greek and Spanish. He also studied and wrote about the Anglo-Saxon language (Old English) and studied German to some extent. After his death, a number of other books, dictionaries, and grammar manuals in various languages were found in Jefferson's library, suggesting that he studied additional languages, possibly including Hebrew, Arabic, Irish, Russian, Welsh, and various Native American languages. His proficiency in these languages is not known.

Jefferson, while acting as an American diplomat in Paris, took a short trip along the Rhine. He also had several interactions with German characters such as Friedrich Wilhelm von Steuben, Friedrich Adolf Riedesel, and Friedrich Caspar von Geismar, who Jefferson met with in Hesse-Hanau in his trip. Despite his education, Jefferson remarked that it was difficult for him to travel due to his lack of command in the German language. During that trip, he briefly made his way into the Dutch Republic, where he met Van Hogendorp, a royal Dutch noble, so it is likely he could speak some Dutch.

Regarding Spanish, Jefferson told John Quincy Adams that he had learned the language over the course of nineteen days while sailing from the U.S. to France. He had borrowed a Spanish grammar and a copy of Don Quixote from a friend and read them on the voyage. Adams expressed skepticism, noting Jefferson's tendency to tell "large stories." Though he never visited Portugal, Jefferson also had a number of Portuguese acquaintances and owned some Portuguese books in his private library.

=== James Madison ===
James Madison began his studies of Latin at the age of twelve and had mastered Greek, Latin, Italian, and French (the last reportedly with a Scottish accent) by the time he entered the College of New Jersey, later Princeton University. He produced many translations of Latin orations of Hugo Grotius, Samuel von Pufendorf, and Emer de Vattel. He also studied Horace and Ovid. He learned Greek as an admissions requirement for higher college learning.

While in college, Madison learned to speak and read Hebrew. When he could have graduated, Madison remained at college for an additional year to study ethics and Hebrew in greater depth.

=== James Monroe ===
James Monroe was enrolled in the best school in the Colony of Virginia, Campbelltown Academy, which is why Monroe was later able to immediately take advanced courses in Latin at the College of William & Mary.

Monroe adopted many French customs while a diplomat in Paris, including learning fluent French. The entire Monroe family knew the language, and often spoke it with one another at home.

=== John Quincy Adams ===
John Quincy Adams went to school in both France and the Netherlands, and spoke fluent French and conversational Dutch. Adams strove to improve his abilities in Dutch throughout his life, and at times translated a page of Dutch a day to help improve his mastery of the language. Official documents that he translated were sent to the secretary of state, so that Adams' studies would serve a useful purpose as well. When his father appointed him ambassador to Prussia, Adams dedicated himself to becoming proficient in German in order to have the tools to strengthen relations between the two countries. He improved his skills by translating articles from German to English, and his studies made his diplomatic efforts more successful.

In addition to the two languages he spoke fluently, he also studied Italian, but he admitted to making little progress in it since he had no one with whom to practice speaking and hearing the language, as well as Russian, but never achieved fluency. Adams also read Latin very well, translated a page a day of Latin text, and studied classical Greek in his spare time.

=== Andrew Jackson ===
Andrew Jackson was exposed to Greek and Latin as part of his education.

=== Martin Van Buren ===
Martin Van Buren was the only American president who did not speak English as his first language, and was the first of non-British ancestry. He was born in Kinderhook, New York, a primarily Dutch community, spoke Dutch as his first language, and continued to speak it at home. He learned English as a second language while attending Kinderhook's local school house. He obtained a small understanding of Latin while studying at Kinderhook Academy and solidified his understanding of English there.

=== William Henry Harrison ===
At Hampden–Sydney College, William Henry Harrison spent a considerable time learning Latin, and favored reading about the military history of ancient Rome and Julius Caesar from Latin histories. While there, he also learned a small amount of French.

=== John Tyler ===
John Tyler excelled at school, where he learned both Latin and Greek.

=== James K. Polk ===
Although James K. Polk had no background in foreign languages upon entering college, he proved a quick learner. Upon graduating from the University of North Carolina, he was asked to give the welcoming address at graduation; he chose to do so in Latin. He proved very proficient in classical languages, and received honors in both Greek and Latin on his degree.

=== James Buchanan ===
James Buchanan studied a traditional classical curriculum, which included Latin and Greek, at the private Old Stone Academy before transferring to Dickinson College. He excelled in both subjects.

=== Rutherford B. Hayes ===
Rutherford B. Hayes studied Latin and Greek at the Isaac Webb school in Middletown, Connecticut. He initially struggled with the languages, but soon became proficient in them. He also briefly studied French there.

=== James A. Garfield ===
James A. Garfield knew and taught both Latin and Greek, and he was the first president to campaign in two languages (English and German). He was also ambidextrous. Stories emerged to the effect that Garfield would entertain his friends by having them ask him questions, and then writing the answer in Latin with one hand while simultaneously writing the answer in Greek with the other. However, specifics of these stories are not documented. Garfield reportedly was a bright student during his time at Williams College in Massachusetts, where his knack for languages would expand to include German and Hebrew.

=== Chester A. Arthur ===
Chester A. Arthur was known to be comfortable enough in Latin and Greek to converse with other men who knew the languages.

== 20th century ==
=== Theodore Roosevelt ===
Theodore Roosevelt read both German and French very well and kept a good number of books written in these languages in his personal library. A foreign correspondent noted that although Roosevelt spoke clearly and quickly, he had a noticeable German accent while speaking in French. He first learned German, French, and Latin starting at the age of 13, when his parents hired a tutor, and French was spoken on occasion at the dinner table to encourage fluency. He quite often read fiction, philosophy, religion, and history books in both French and German, for example Leo Tolstoy's Anna Karenina in French translation during his time ranching in the Dakotas. He was most comfortable with informal discussions in French, but he made two public addresses in the West Indies in French in 1916. He recognized that, while he spoke French rapidly and was able to understand others, he used unusual grammar "without tense or gender". John Hay, secretary of state under Roosevelt, commented that Roosevelt spoke odd, grammatically incorrect French, but was never difficult to understand.

Though he could read and understand the language thoroughly, Roosevelt struggled to speak German. When Roosevelt attempted to speak with a native German, he had to apologize after botching the attempt. While not fluent in the language, Roosevelt was also able to read Italian. Though he at one point studied Greek and Latin, Roosevelt found both languages a "dreary labor" to translate. Roosevelt most likely studied some form of these two languages for his Harvard entrance exam, though he never maintained a good control of them.

=== Woodrow Wilson ===
Woodrow Wilson learned German as part of earning his Ph.D. in history and political science from Johns Hopkins University. However, he never claimed proficiency in the language. While he did read German sources when they were available, he often complained about the amount of time and effort it took him.

=== Herbert Hoover ===
Herbert Hoover spoke Latin and some Mandarin Chinese.

Hoover and his wife, Lou, translated De re metallica, a 16th-century tract on mining written in Latin. The effort took five years, during which the Hoovers sacrificed much of their spare time. While at Stanford University, Hoover had access to the extensive library of John Casper Branner, where he found the important mining book which had never been fully translated into English. For years, five nights of the week were spent translating the book, including naming objects that the author had merely described, drawing on their own subject-matter knowledge (Herbert being a mining engineer and Lou being a geologist as well as a Latinist). The Hoovers' translation is still considered definitive and has been the model for later translations of De re metallica into other modern languages.

The Hoovers learned Mandarin while living in China from April 1899 until August 1900. Lou Hoover studied the language daily in China but Herbert Hoover confessed that he "never absorbed more than a hundred words." Still, the two would converse in their limited Mandarin when they wanted to keep their conversations private from guests or the press.

=== Franklin D. Roosevelt ===
Franklin D. Roosevelt spoke both French and German. He was raised speaking both, as his early education consisted of governesses from Europe preparing him for boarding school in his teens. In particular, he had governesses from France and Germany who taught him their respective languages. A Swiss governess, Jeanne Sandoz, furthered his studies in both languages, particularly stressing French. Roosevelt spent one summer of his schooling in Germany; both his time with his instructors and his frequent trips abroad allowed him to master both German and French, though he always spoke them with a distinct New England accent. Though he never had a mastery of the language, his governesses also taught him a limited amount of Latin. Roosevelt gave a bilingual speech (in English and French) during a 1936 visit to Quebec City.

=== Jimmy Carter ===
Jimmy Carter had a functional command of Spanish, but had never been grammatically perfect. Carter studied the language at the United States Naval Academy and continued his studies while an officer of the United States Navy. Carter sometimes spoke to constituents in Spanish, including in 1976 television campaign advertisements. Like his English, Carter's Spanish had a distinct Southern accent.

Carter could speak fairly fluently, but joked about his sometimes flawed understanding of the language while discoursing with native speakers. As president, Carter addressed the Mexican Congress in Spanish. Carter had written and given a number of other addresses in Spanish including during his post presidency when he made a historic visit to Cuba in 2002. To practice his Spanish, he and his wife Rosalynn read the Bible in Spanish to each other every night.

=== Bill Clinton ===
While a freshman at Georgetown University, Bill Clinton was required to choose a foreign language to study, and chose German because he was "impressed by the clarity and precision of the language". He is able to hold casual conversation in the language. In 1994, while giving a lengthy speech in English at the Brandenburg Gate, he said two sentences in German, pledging to his audience that "Amerika steht an Ihrer Seite jetzt und für immer." ("America stands on your side, now and forever.") and "Nichts wird uns aufhalten. Alles ist möglich. Berlin ist frei." ("Nothing will stop us. Everything is possible. Berlin is free.")

== 21st century ==
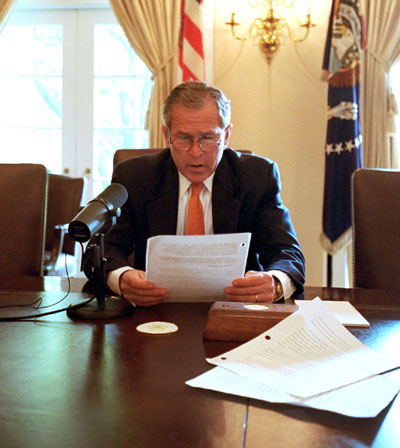
George W. Bush on May 5 (Cinco de Mayo), 2001, delivering the first weekly radio address of the president of the United States broadcast in both English and Spanish by any president.

=== George W. Bush ===
George W. Bush speaks some Spanish and has delivered speeches in the language. His speeches in Spanish have had English interspersed throughout. During his first campaign for the presidency in 2000, some news outlets reported that he was fluent in the language, though a campaign spokeswoman and others described him as having conversational proficiency rather than being "completely fluent."

=== Barack Obama ===
From the age of six through ten (1967–1971), Barack Obama lived in Jakarta, Indonesia and attended local Indonesian-language schools. He reportedly was able to exchange greetings and "pleasantries" in "fluent Indonesian" with Indonesia's then-president and others. During a White House interview with an Indonesian journalist, he remarked that he "used to be fluent" in Indonesian but that he had not been able to use it much as an adult. During his 2008 presidential campaign, while promoting foreign-language education in the U.S., Obama quipped to the audience, "I don't speak a foreign language. It's embarrassing!" However during his state visit to Indonesia in 2010, Obama displayed his Indonesian language in his speech at University of Indonesia.

== Table ==
President		Dutch	French	German	Ancient Greek	Italian	Latin	Spanish	Other languages
2	John Adams		Fluent				Fluent		
3	Thomas Jefferson	Partial	Fluent	Partial	Reading only	Fluent	Fluent	Reading only	Partial – several, including Old English
4	James Madison		Fluent		Fluent	Fluent	Fluent		Fluent – Hebrew
5	James Monroe		Fluent						
6	John Quincy Adams	Partial	Fluent	Fluent	Partial	Partial	Fluent	Partial	Partial – Russian
8	Martin Van Buren	Native					Partial		Fluent – English (second language)
9	William Henry Harrison		Partial				Fluent		
10	John Tyler				Fluent		Fluent		
11	James K. Polk				Fluent		Fluent		
15	James Buchanan				Fluent		Fluent		
19	Rutherford B. Hayes				Fluent		Fluent		
20	James A. Garfield			Partial	Fluent		Fluent		Partial - Hebrew
21	Chester A. Arthur				Fluent		Fluent		
26	Theodore Roosevelt		Fluent	Fluent	Partial	Partial	Partial		
28	Woodrow Wilson			Partial					
31	Herbert Hoover						Fluent		Partial – Mandarin Chinese
32	Franklin D. Roosevelt		Fluent	Partial			Partial		
39	Jimmy Carter							Partial	
42	Bill Clinton			Partial					
43	George W. Bush							Partial	
44	Barack Obama								Partial – Indonesian

== Chart ==
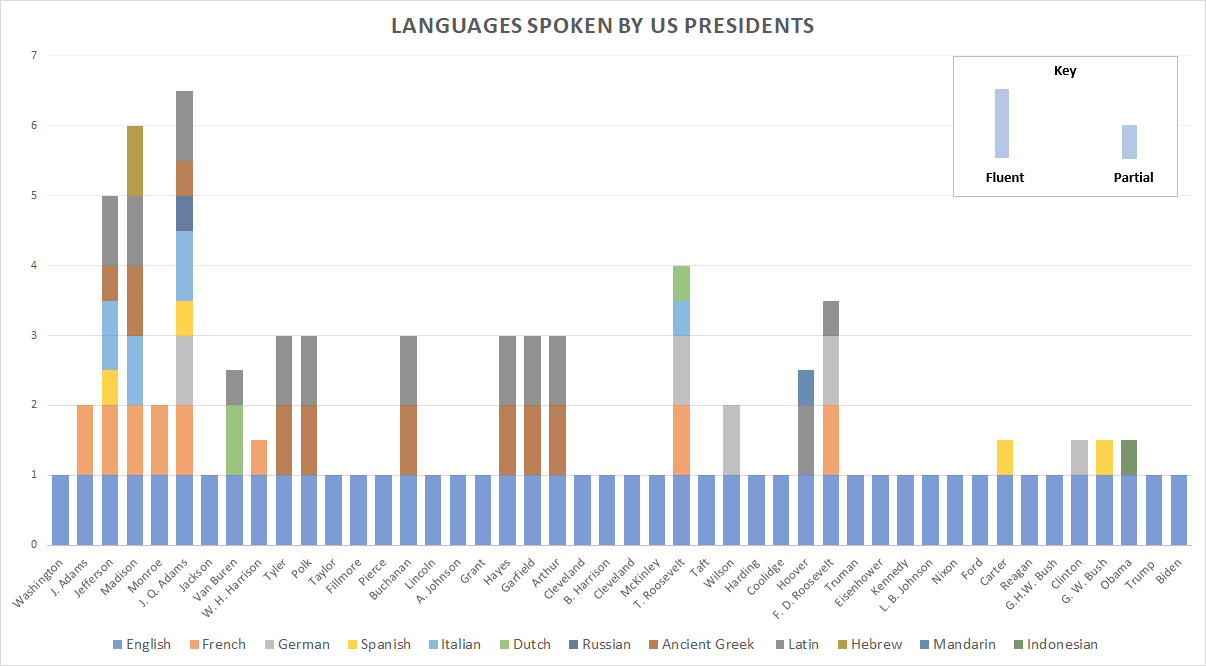
Graph illustrating the languages spoken by U.S. presidents and indicating their proficiency levels, whether fluent or partial

== See also ==
- Languages spoken by presidents of the Philippines

== Bibliography ==
- Adams, John Quincy (2008). Charles Francis Adams, Sr. (ed.). Memoirs of John Quincy Adams: Comprising Portions of His Diary from 1795 to 1848. Select Biographies Reprint Series. Vol. 1. Philadelphia: J. B. Lippincott & Co. ISBN 9780836950212.
- Baker, Jean (2004). James Buchanan. New York City: Macmillan Publishers. ISBN 0-8050-6946-1.
- Behrman, Carol (2005). James K. Polk. Minneapolis: Twenty-First Century Books. ISBN 0-8225-1396-X.
- Brookhiser, Richard (2011). James Madison. New York, NY: Basic Books. ISBN 9780465063802.
- "Carter Was Missionary Eight Years Ago". Times-News. Hendersonville, North Carolina. Associated Press. July 1, 1976.
- Carter, Jimmy (2004). Sharing Good Times. New York City: Simon & Schuster. ISBN 0-7432-7033-9.
- Clinton, Bill (2005). My Life. New York City: Random House. ISBN 1-4000-3003-X.
- Coker, Jeffrey (2005). Franklin D. Roosevelt: A Biography. Westport, Connecticut: Greenwood Publishing Group. ISBN 0-313-32337-2.
- Crapo, Mike (September 5, 2007). "Our Proud American Legacy". The News-Examiner.
- Freedman, Russell (1992). Franklin Delano Roosevelt. Boston: Houghton Mifflin Harcourt. ISBN 0-395-62978-0.
- Gormley, Beatrice (2000). President George W. Bush: Our Forty-Third President. New York City: Simon & Schuster. ISBN 0-689-84410-7.
- "Great But Childish America – To French Correspondent in Naples Roosevelt Personifies It". The New York Times. April 6, 1909.
- Harper, John Lamberton (1996). American Visions of Europe: Franklin D. Roosevelt, George F. Kennan, and Dean G. Acheson. Cambridge: Cambridge University Press. ISBN 0-521-56628-2.
- Hodge, Carl Cavanagh; Cathal J. Nolan (2007). US Presidents and Foreign Policy. Santa Barbara, California: ABC-CLIO. ISBN 978-1-85109-790-6.
- Holland, William (1836). The Life and Times of Martin Van Buren, Vice President of the United States. Belknap & Hamersley.
- "Hoover Gave Years to Latin Translation: With Mrs. Hoover He Devoted Five Evenings a Week to Study of Mining Book". Lewiston Evening Journal. Lewiston, Maine. June 29, 1933.
- Ivins, Molly; Lou Dubose (2000). Shrub: The Short but Happy Political Life of George W. Bush. New York City: Random House. ISBN 0-375-75714-7.
- Ketcham, Ralph Louis (1990). James Madison: A Biography. Charlottesville, Virginia: University of Virginia Press. ISBN 0-8139-1265-2.
- King, David (2009). Herbert Hoover. Tarrytown, New York: Marshall Cavendish. ISBN 978-0-7614-3626-3.
- Maraniss, David (1996). First in His Class: The Biography of Bill Clinton. New York City: Simon & Schuster. ISBN 0-684-81890-6.
- May, Gary; Sean Wilentz (2008). John Tyler. New York City: Macmillan Publishers. ISBN 978-0-8050-8238-8.
- Mayo, Louise (2006). President James K. Polk: The Dark Horse President. Hauppauge, New York: Nova Publishers. ISBN 1-59454-718-1.
- McBride, Deborah (March 29, 1978). "Venezuelans Cheer Carter's Canal Talk". The Spokesman-Review. Spokane, Washington.
- McCullough, David (2001). John Adams. New York City: Simon & Schuster. ISBN 0-684-81363-7.
- McLeod, Don (June 13, 1976). "John Adams Was Floor Manager of Independence". The Ledger. Lakeland, Florida.
- Owens, Robert Martin (2007). Mr. Jefferson's Hammer: William Henry Harrison and the Origins of American Indian Policy. Norman, Oklahoma: University of Oklahoma Press. ISBN 978-0-8061-3842-8.
- Pestritto, Ronald (2005). Woodrow Wilson and the Roots of Modern Liberalism. Lanham, Maryland: Rowman & Littlefield. ISBN 0-7425-1517-6.
- Reeves, Thomas (1975). Gentleman boss: the life of Chester Alan Arthur. Knopf. ISBN 0-394-46095-2.
- Remini, Robert V. (1977). Andrew Jackson and the Course of American Empire, 1767–1821. New York, NY: Harper & Row Publishers, Inc. ISBN 978-0-8018-5912-0. OCLC 1145801830.
- Trefousse, Hans Louis (2002). Rutherford B. Hayes. New York City: Macmillan Publishers. ISBN 0-8050-6908-9.
- "Carter Urges Cuba to Embrace Freedom: Spanish Address Carried Live on Cuban TV, Radio". The Washington Post. May 15, 2002.
- "Theodore Roosevelt, The Man". The New York Times. New York City. October 9, 1898.
- Wagenknecht, Edward (2008). The Seven Worlds of Theodore Roosevelt. Globe Pequot. ISBN 978-1-59921-493-1.
- Widmer, Edward (2005). Martin Van Buren. Macmillan Publishers. ISBN 0-8050-6922-4.
