= Joe Gormley =

Joseph or Joe Gormley may refer to:

- Joe Gormley (baseball) (1866–1950), pitcher for the Philadelphia Phillies (1891)
- Joe Gormley (footballer) (born 1989), football player (Cliftonville FC, Peterborough United, St Johnstone)
- Joe Gormley, Baron Gormley (1917–1993), President of the National Union of Mineworkers (1971–82)
- Joseph L. Gormley (1914–2004), American forensic scientist

== See also ==
- Gormley (surname)
