= Pamela Herd =

American sociologist

- Born: USA
- Spouse: Donald Moynihan

Academic background
- Education: BA, sociology, 1997, Colby College; PhD, sociology, 2002, Syracuse University
- Thesis: Crediting care, citizenship or marriage? Gender, race, class, and Social Security reform. (2002)

Academic work
- Institutions: McCourt School of Public Policy; University of Wisconsin–Madison; University of Texas at Austin

Pamela Herd is an American sociologist. She is a professor of social policy at the University of Michigan Ford School of Public Policy. Herd's research focuses on inequality and how it intersects with health, aging, and policy.

== Early life and education ==
Herd was raised by a single mother. She completed her Bachelor of Arts degree in sociology at Colby College and her PhD in the same subject at Syracuse University. As an undergraduate student, Herd was a member of Phi Beta Kappa and graduated as the school's most distinguished student in sociology.

== Career ==
=== Texas and UW-Madison ===
Upon completing her formal education, Herd accepted an assistant professor position at the University of Texas at Austin's Lyndon B. Johnson School of Public Affairs from 2004 to 2005.

Herd joined the faculty at the University of Wisconsin–Madison's Robert M. La Follette School of Public Affairs in 2005. As an assistant professor of Public Affairs and Sociology, Herd co-authored Market Friendly or Family Friendly? The State and Gender Inequality in Old Age. Due to her academic research, she was also elected a Member of the National Academy of Social Insurance. In 2008, Herd won a $30,000 Rockefeller Foundation Innovation Award to Strengthen Social Security for Vulnerable Groups "to develop a proposal to improve Social Security benefits for older low-income women who raised children."

In 2010, Herd joined sociologist Bob Hauser as co-director of the Wisconsin Longitudinal Study (WLS), a long-term examination of a random sample of 10,317 men and women who graduated from Wisconsin high schools in 1957. She also published a study exposing a link between higher academic performance in high school and better health throughout life. As a result of her research, Herd received two Vilas awards from the university; a Vilas Faculty Mid-Career Investigator Award from the Provost's Office and Graduate School's Vilas Associates Competition.

As a Full Professor, Herd was named to serve on the National Institutes of Health's Social Sciences and Population Studies Study Section and the National Academy of Sciences Standing Committee on the Future of Major NSF-Funded Social Science Surveys. In Spring 2017, Herd was appointed chair of the Board of Overseers for the General Social Survey (GSS). The GSS is the only full-probability, a personal-interview survey designed to monitor changes in social characteristics and attitudes being conducted in the United States.

=== Georgetown University ===
In 2018, Herd and her husband Don Moynihan left UW-Madison to join the faculty at Georgetown University's McCourt School of Public Policy. Alongside her husband, Herd published her second book titled Administrative Burden. Policymaking by other Means. Their book received the 2019 Louis Brownlow Book Award from the National Academy of Public Administration and the 2020 Outstanding Book Award from the Public and Nonprofit Section of the National Academy of Management. During the COVID-19 pandemic, Herd and Moynihan released a Health Affairs policy brief outlining how bureaucracy, or administrative burdens, can create barriers to critical social welfare programs and how the structure of the programs may not be designed to best support people in need. She also began investigating how to reduce administrative burdens in order to connect domestic violence survivors with critical support services.

=== University of Michigan ===
In 2024, Herd was appointed to a five-year term as the Carol Kakalec Kohn Professor of Social Policy at the University of Michigan Ford School of Public Policy. She was separately appointed a tenured professor of public policy there at the same time.

In 2025, Herd and Moynihan published "Administrative Burdens in the Social Safety Net" in the Journal of Economic Perspectives, surveying how bureaucratic obstacles in programs such as Medicaid, SNAP, and Social Security shape access to the social safety net.

In 2026, Herd published research showing no negative relationship between community water fluoridation and adolescent or adult cognitive function. That same year, she and Moynihan received the Riccucci-O'Leary Award from the Public Management Research Association for the best article on diversity in public management. In April 2026, Herd delivered her Carol Kakalec Kohn Professorship inaugural lecture at the University of Michigan.

== Selected publications ==
- Market Friendly or Family Friendly? The State and Gender Inequality in Old Age (2007)
- Administrative Burden: Policymaking by other Means (2019)

== Personal life ==
Herd is married to Donald Moynihan.
