= McCourt School of Public Policy =

Constituent school of Georgetown University

Coordinates: 38°54′27″N 77°4′24″W

Georgetown University McCourt School of Public Policy
- Seal of Georgetown University
- Former names: Georgetown Public Policy Institute (1990–2013)
- Type: Private
- Established: 2013
- Parent institution: Georgetown University
- Affiliations: Roman Catholic (Jesuit)
- Students: 450
- Location: 125 E St NW, Washington, DC 20001, Washington, D.C., U.S.
- Campus: Urban
- Website: mccourt.georgetown.edu

The McCourt School of Public Policy at Georgetown University is located in Washington, D.C. The McCourt School offers one undergraduate degree, five master's degree programs, nine dual degrees, global learning opportunities in a range of destinations, and certificate and other executive education programming. The McCourt School has 52 full-time faculty members, 54 research faculty members and fellows, more than 100 affiliated faculty members, and approximately 500 enrolled students across the various degree and executive education programs.

In the summer of 2024, the McCourt School relocated to 125 E Street NW at Georgetown's Capitol Campus. Formerly known as the Georgetown Public Policy Institute (GPPI), the McCourt School became Georgetown University's ninth school in October 2013 as a result of a $100 million gift from Georgetown University alumnus Frank McCourt.

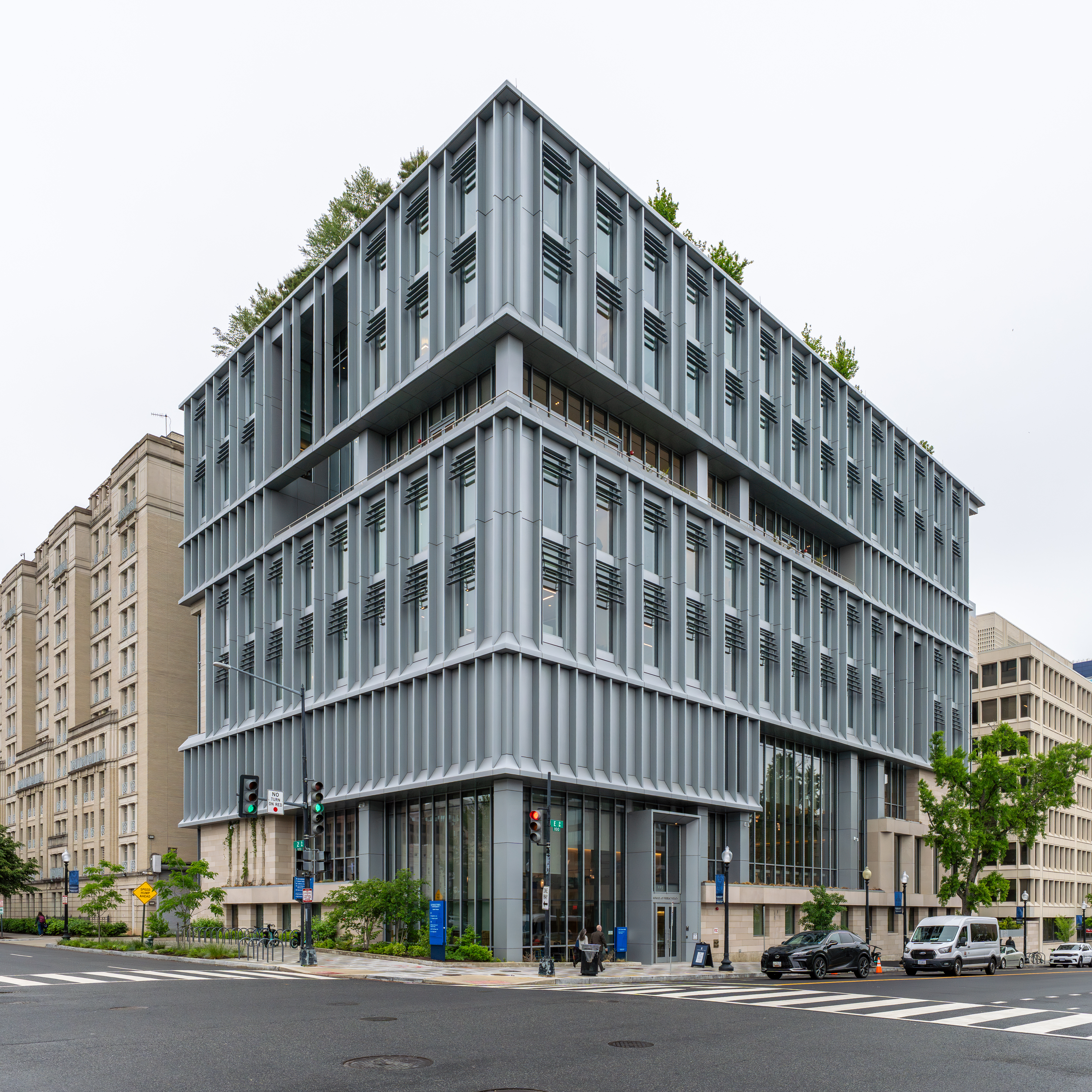
School at 125 E Street NW

== History ==
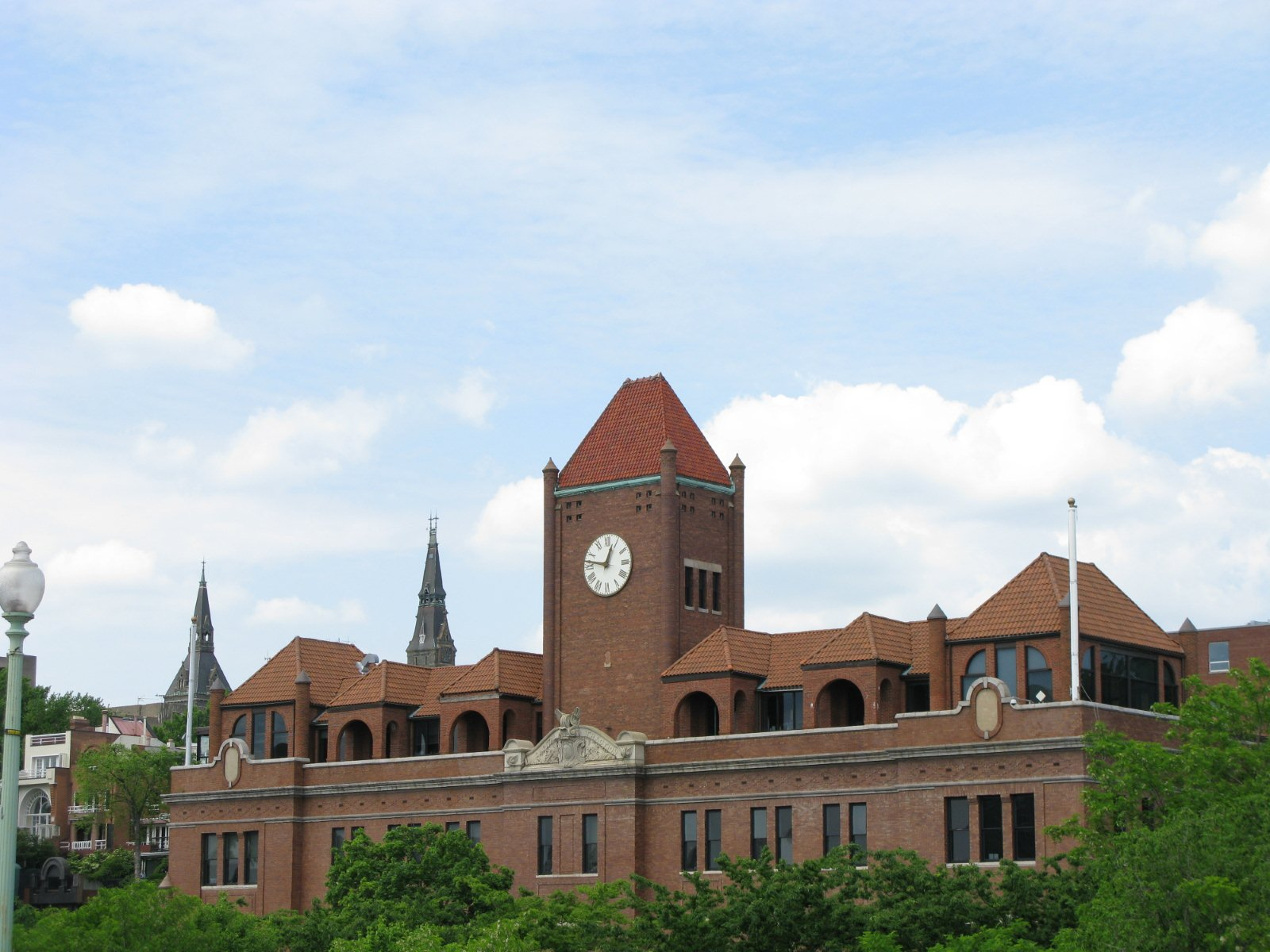
Until 2010, the Car Barn was home to the Georgetown Public Policy Institute (GPPI), the precursor to the McCourt School.

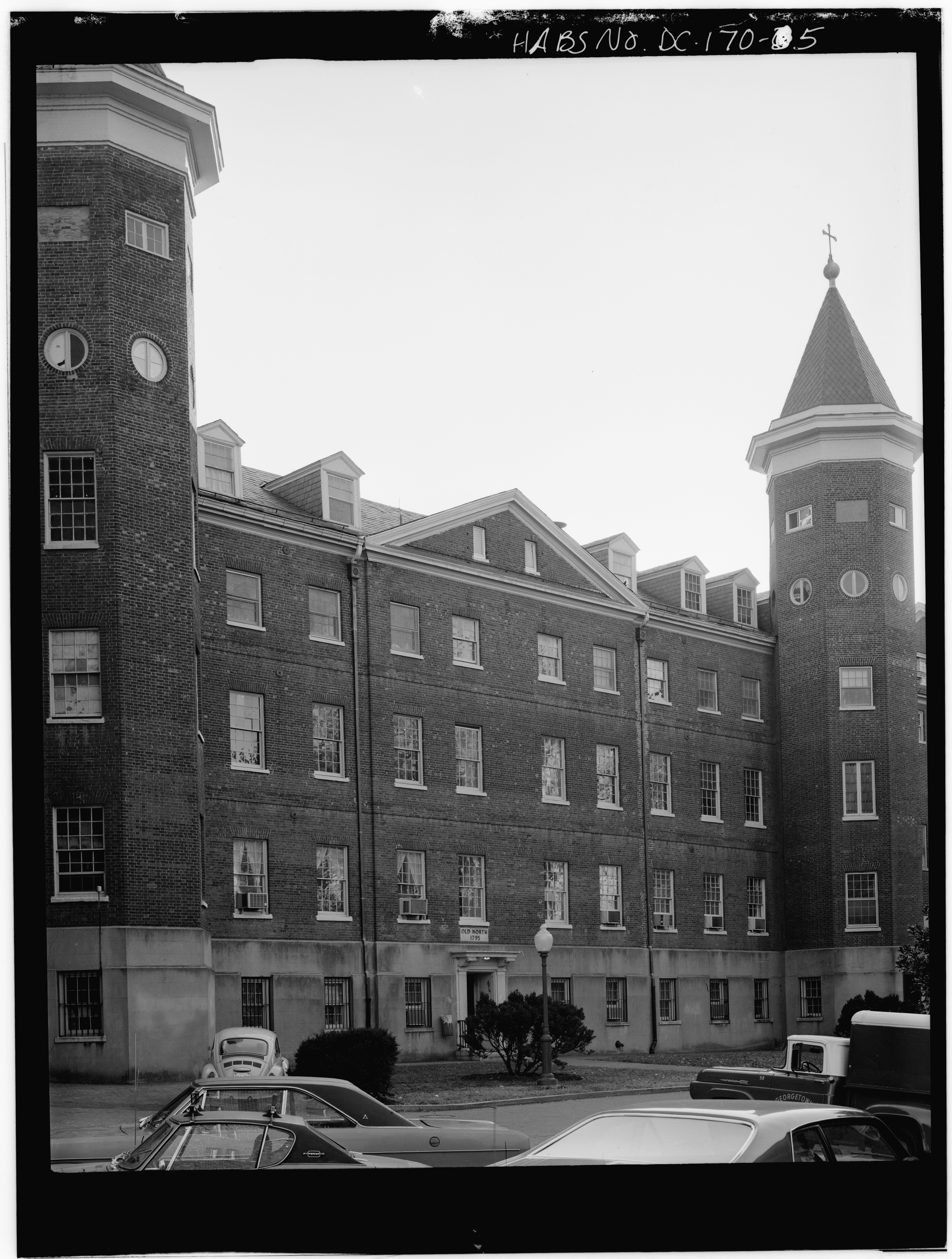
Old North was home to the McCourt School up until the summer of 2024.

The idea of establishing a public policy school in Washington, D.C. originated in the Georgetown University Department of Government and Economics in the late 1970s.

In 1980, the Government Department instituted a certificate program and in 1982 hired two junior faculty members to teach courses in public policy. For the next five years, the Public Policy Program expanded, granting a master's degree program in government with a concentration in public policy to approximately 15 students. In 1985, the Government Department hired the first part-time director to help establish the framework for the Public Policy Program. By the late 1980s, enrollment in the program had grown to about 75 students.

In 1990, the new president of Georgetown University, Father Leo O'Donovan, S.J., prioritized the expansion of the Public Policy Program under the direction of the program's first full-time director, Colin Campbell S.J., a Georgetown professor of philosophy and politics. Dr. Campbell was charged with the task of significantly expanding the program's faculty, students, and facilities.

In 1996, the Public Policy Program was renamed the Georgetown Public Policy Institute. GPPI experienced rapid expansion after Judy Feder was appointed dean in 1999. Faculty, applications, enrollment, staff, and facilities all grew under Feder’s tenure. A new master’s degree, the Master of Policy Management (MPM) for mid-career students was added in 2001, and a part-time cohort program for the Master of Public Policy was developed.

During the deanship of Edward Montgomery, GPPI enrolled its first students in the Master of International Development Policy (MIDP) program in the fall of 2012. In September 2013, the University announced a $100 million gift from alumnus Frank McCourt (C’75) for the establishment of the McCourt School of Public Policy, the ninth and newest school at Georgetown University.

The McCourt School currently offers five master’s degree programs, one undergraduate program and nine dual-degree programs, and includes 18 affiliated research centers, 52 full-time faculty members, 54 research faculty members and fellows, more than 100 affiliated faculty members, and approximately 500 enrolled students across the various degree and executive education programs.

In March of 2021, the McCourt School received a second $100 million gift from Frank McCourt, half of which was allocated to financial aid and scholarships and the other half of which was allocated to faculty and research.

In the summer of 2024, the McCourt School relocated from Old North to 125 E St. at Georgetown’s Capitol Campus. For the first time in its history, the entire school was housed in one building.

== Academics ==
=== Master of Public Policy ===
The Master of Public Policy (MPP) is a 48-credit degree program offered as both a two-year full-time and three-year part-time program. The program's focus is designed to meet the needs of individuals desiring a strong analytical background, particularly those planning careers in public or private sector policy analysis and management.

==== Dual degrees ====
For the MPP degree, MSPP offers dual degree programs with Georgetown Law Center, McDonough School of Business, Walsh School of Foreign Service, and the Graduate School of Arts and Sciences, as well as with the University of Geneva, and HEC Paris:

- Master of Public Policy/Master of Business Administration (MPP/MBA)
- Master of Public Policy/PhD in government (MPP/PhD)
- Master of Public Policy/PhD in psychology (MPP/PhD)
- Master of Public Policy/Juris Doctor (MPP/JD)
- Master of Public Policy/ Master of Science in foreign service (MPP/MS)
- Master of Public Policy/ Master of Arts in German and European studies (MPP/MA)
- Master of Public Policy/International Organizations MBA (MPP/IOMBA)
- Master of Public Policy/Master in Management (MPP/MiM)

=== Master of International Development Policy ===
The Master of International Development Policy (MIDP) is a 48-credit degree program. Its curriculum focuses on economics and the rigorous analytical and technical skills needed to tackle complex challenges in developing and emerging economies.

=== Master of Policy Management ===
The Master of Policy Management (MPM) is a 36-credit program for professionals with 5+ years of experience. The program balances analytics, management and substance within policy areas, providing management and analytical skills for advancement.

=== Master of Science in Data Science for Public Policy ===
The Master of Science in Data Science for Public Policy (MSDSPP) is a 39-credit program based on a dynamic combination of the McCourt School's renowned policy analysis curriculum and state-of-the-art, master's-level data science courses.

=== Executive Master in Policy Leadership ===
The Executive Master of Policy Leadership is a 30-credit, interdisciplinary degree program that weaves economics and political science with public policy and administration. The Executive Master of Policy Leadership curriculum is divided into seven core courses, a policy capstone project and two electives. It can be completed on a standard (15 months) or extended (three years) schedule.

=== Joint Program in Public Policy (undergraduate degree) ===
Offered jointly by the College of Arts & Sciences and McCourt School of Public Policy, the A.B. in Public Policy is a unique degree that combines a liberal arts and policy-focused interdisciplinary and experiential curriculum with living and learning opportunities on the Hilltop and downtown DC.

=== Study Abroad Locations ===
Along with dual degree options in partnership with universities in Europe and Asia, the McCourt School offers study abroad opportunities at:

- Hertie School of Governance; Berlin, Germany
- Lee Kuan Yew School of Public Policy; Singapore
- Bocconi University; Milan, Italy
- Sciences Po; Paris, France

== Rankings ==
The McCourt School is a top ranked public policy graduate school in the United States. The 2023 U.S. News & World Report ranked the school 10th best among graduate public affairs programs and 5th best in international global policy and administration. The McCourt School, ranked first in the Washington, D.C. area, was also rated 9th best in health policy and management, 10th in public policy analysis, and 10th in social policy. The McCourt School is not ranked by the National Research Council because it does not have a doctoral program.

== Student organizations ==
- Georgetown Public Policy Student Association: The Georgetown Public Policy Student Association (GPPSA) is the student government of MSPP. GPPSA facilitates communication among students, administration and faculty; organizes academic, professional, social, and community service initiatives; and provides support and funding for MSPP student organizations.
- The Latin American Policy Association (LAPA): The Latin American Policy Association (LAPA) was developed in the Spring of 2015. The Latin American Policy Association seeks to disseminate knowledge and awareness about Latin American issues and policies among the McCourt School community, in addition to advancing the interests of Latin American students in the McCourt School and in the larger Georgetown community.
- McCourt School Policy Conference: Each year, MSPP students work together to plan an annual public policy conference. The event brings distinguished academics and policymakers to Washington, D.C., to discuss the most pressing and complex social issues of the day.
- Georgetown Public Policy Review: The Georgetown Public Policy Review (GPPR) is MSPP's nonpartisan, student-run peer-reviewed academic journal. Approximately 50 staff members work to produce and promote this print publication, The Georgetown Public Policy Review as well as an online blog, GPPR Online.
- McCourt Policy in Practice: Since 2007, MSPP students have worked to develop a relationship with the residents of Roatán, Honduras. Four groups of students have now traveled to the island of Roatán over Spring Break to implement ongoing service and development projects. McCourt Policy in Practice (MPiP) used to be known as Project Honduras. In the last year, MPiP has also performed social projects in Cabarete, a small town in the Dominican Republic, along with different non-profit organizations focused in educations and health policy.
- Public Policy OUT: Public Policy OUT (P-POUT) is the MSPP LGBT policy issue group. This includes both national and local policy issues, as well as issues facing LGBT individuals working in policy-focused careers. The group focuses specifically on education, networking, outreach, and awareness.
- EduWonks: EduWonks is Georgetown's premier education policy student organization. EduWonks facilitates policy dialogue, professional growth experiences, and interdisciplinary collaboration through our speaker events, policy chats, and service initiatives in the DC community. Notable events in the 2016–2017 academic year included Kaya Henderson, chancellor of DC Public Schools, and a yearlong policy thesis mentoring program with Cesar Chavez PCS. In the coming years EduWonks plans to diversify their speaker series, increase the reach and impact of their service initiatives, and create a comprehensive database of recommended internships and alumni contacts in the education sector.
- Women in Public Policy Initiative: MSPP's Women in Public Policy Initiative (WPPI) is dedicated to developing exceptional female leaders in public policy and increasing awareness of issues that disproportionately affect women and girls through strategic partnerships, service, and advocacy.
- McCourt Energy and Environmental group (McCourt E&E):
- East Asian Policy Association: East Asian Policy Association (EAPA) aims to create a platform engaging McCourt students in discussions related to East Asian policies and political issues.
- South Asian Policy and Research Initiative: The South Asian Policy and Research Initiative (SAPRI) is a student-led initiative dedicated to raising awareness on the critical development challenges facing economies in South Asia and promoting evidence-based policies in the region.

== Research centers, projects and organizations ==
The McCourt School's affiliated centers are engaged in research, professional training, and sharing of information on Congress, health policies, and social policies.

- Institute of Politics and Public Service (GU Politics): Partake in the study of politics and the political process and engage in student-driven conversations with elected officials, policymakers, members of the media, and others.
- The Government Affairs Institute (GAI): The Government Affairs Institute provides education and training about congressional processes, organization, and practices, and about selected legislative policy issues.
- The Georgetown University Initiative on Innovation, Development and Evaluation (GUI^{2}DE): Gui^{2}de conducts empirical field-based research to assess the impact and effectiveness of interventions and policies aimed at empowering individuals in developing countries to improve their lives.
- The Health Policy Institute: HPI is a multi-disciplinary group of faculty and staff conducting research on key issues in health policy and health services research, including health care financing, the uninsured, and health insurance reform.
- HealthCare Financing Initiative: The Health Care Financing Initiative conducts research in health care financing, and fosters engagement between students, faculty, policymakers, and industry leaders in health care financing.
- Center for Children and Families: CCF is an independent, nonpartisan policy and research center whose mission is to expand and improve health coverage for America's children and families.
- Center on Health Insurance Reforms (CHIR): CHIR is composed of a team of nationally recognized experts on private health insurance and health reform. Our mission is to improve access to affordable and adequate health insurance by providing balanced, evidence-based research, analysis, and strategic advice.
- The Center on Education and the Workforce: The center is an independent, nonprofit research and policy institute that studies the link between education, career qualifications, and workforce demands. The center conducts research, engagement, and outreach to policymakers and practitioners.
- The Center for Juvenile Justice Reform (CJJR): CJJR advances a balanced, multi-systems approach to reducing juvenile delinquency that promotes positive child and youth development, while also holding youth accountable.
- The Center for Public and Nonprofit Leadership (CPNL): CPNL is an education, research and training center dedicated to the development of public, nonprofit and philanthropic leadership.
- The Center for Research on Children in the United States (CROCUS): CROCUS focuses on policy issues related to children, including early childhood education, pre-K programs, Head Start, and child care programs.
- Edunomics Lab: Edunomics Lab is a research center exploring and modeling complex education fiscal decisions. The center tracks public funds in K-12 and higher education systems to the point of service and examines the effects of policy decisions on the allocation of resources across students and services.
- Better Government Lab: Better Government Lab aims to work with government agencies to improve their effectiveness and make programs and services more accessible to people through the use of data analytics, rigorous evaluations and insights from the social and behavioral sciences.
- FutureEd: FutureEd is an independent, solution-oriented think tank committed to bringing fresh energy to the causes of excellence, equity, and efficiency in K-12 and higher education on behalf of the nation’s disadvantaged students.
- Evidence for Justice Lab: The Evidence for Justice Lab is a research and policy hub with a mission to create a more effective and fair approach to safety and justice through evidence and research.
- The Center on Retirement Initiatives: The Center for Retirement Initiatives promotes, through rigorous research, technical assistance and education, innovative retirement solutions at the state level in the United States.
- Tech and Public Policy: The Tech & Public Policy program at the McCourt School of Public Policy works to shape technology’s promise for a better world. Tech & Public Policy catalyzes cross-disciplinary research, supports emerging leaders, and convenes experts and policymakers to address the challenges and opportunities posed by our ever-evolving digital society.
- The Massive Data Institute: The Massive Data Institute (MDI) at Georgetown’s McCourt School of Public Policy harnesses modern data and computing power to produce cutting edge research and improve public policy decision making.

== List of deans ==
Deans and directors
No.	Name	Years	Notes	Ref.
Directors of the Georgetown Public Policy Program
1	Colin Campbell	1990–1996		
Directors of the Georgetown Public Policy Institute
1	Colin Campbell	1996–1998		
Deans of the Georgetown Public Policy Institute
1	Judy Feder	1999–2008		
2	William T. Gormley	2008–2010	Interim	
3	Edward B. Montgomery	2010–2013		
Deans of the McCourt School of Public Policy
1	Edward B. Montgomery	2013–2017		
2	Michael A. Bailey	2017–2019	Interim	
3	Maria Cancian	2019–2024		
4	Thomas DeLeire	2024-2025	Interim	
5	Carole Roan Gresenz	Starting August 1, 2025		

== Notable faculty ==
- George Akerlof
- E. J. Dionne
- Nada Eissa
- Anthony Fauci
- Judy Feder
- Sheila Foster
- William T. Gormley
- Pamela Herd
- Harry J. Holzer
- Adriana Kugler
- Donald Moynihan
- R. Kent Weaver

== Notable alumni ==
- Laura Chinchilla
- Iván Duque
- Hakeem Jeffries
