= Robert Greenstein =

American think tank director (born 1946)

Bob Greenstein
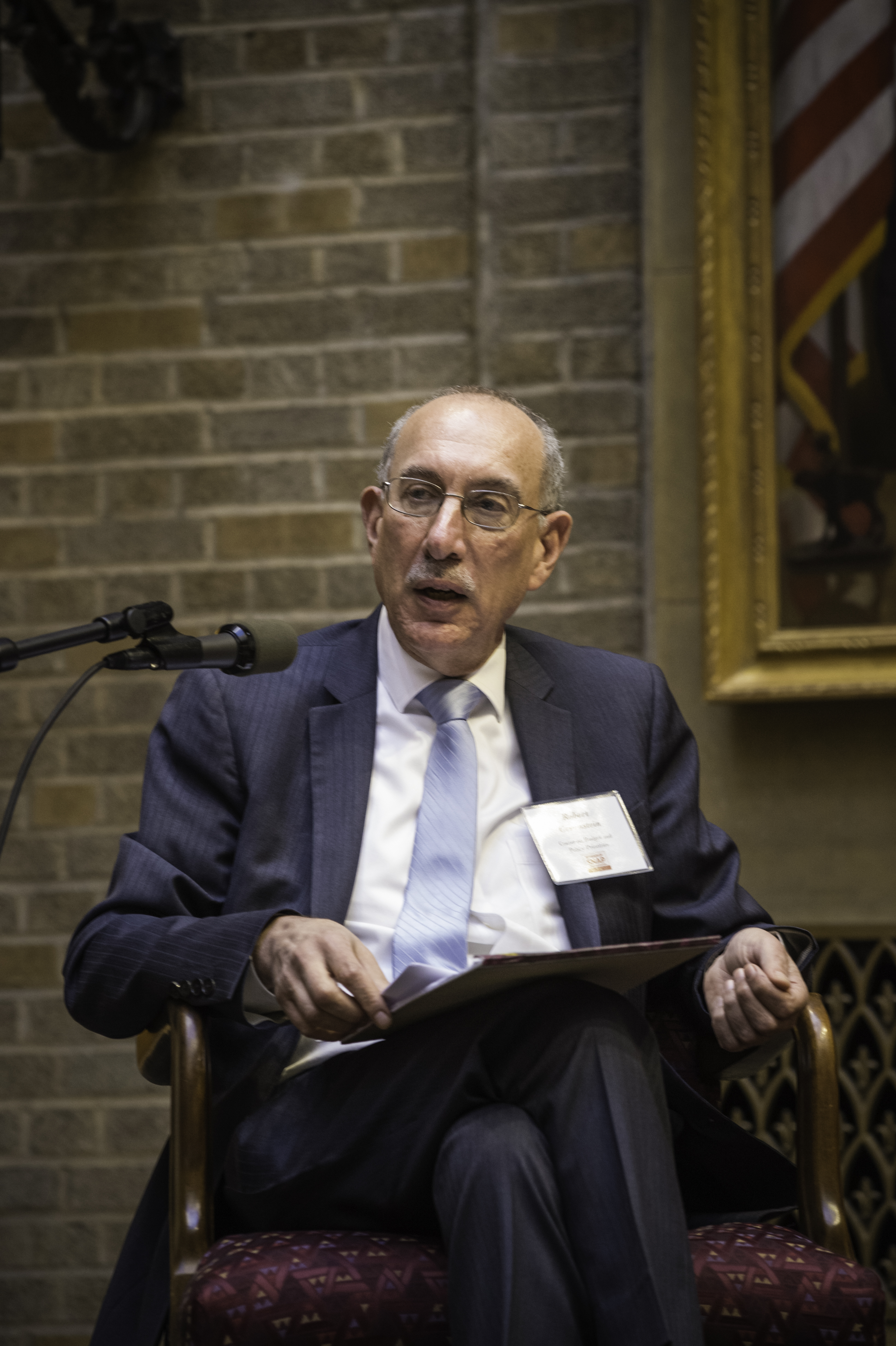
- Born: 1946 (age 79–80); Philadelphia, Pennsylvania, U.S.
- Education: Harvard University (BA); London School of Economics; University of California, Berkeley
- Awards: MacArthur Fellowship (1996); Heinz Award in Public Policy (2008)

Robert Greenstein (born 1946) is founder and former president of the Center on Budget and Policy Priorities (CBPP), a Washington, D.C. think tank that focuses on federal and state fiscal policy and public programs that affect low and moderate-income families and individuals. For four decades he was considered the capitol's de facto lobbyist for the poor, where he "won countless fights that cumulatively directed hundreds of billions, if not trillions, of dollars to programs for low-income people."

== Biography ==
Born in the West Oak Lane neighborhood of Philadelphia, Pennsylvania, Greenstein graduated from Cheltenham High School, in nearby Wyncote, in Montgomery County, Pennsylvania, in 1963, and went on to earn his bachelor's magna cum laude at Harvard University with a National Merit Scholarship and Phi Beta Kappa, spent a year studying international history at the London School of Economics with a Knox Fellowship, and a following year studying toward a PhD in American history at the University of California, Berkeley with a Danforth Fellowship and a Wilson Fellowship.

Greenstein was awarded a MacArthur Fellowship in 1996, and the 14th Annual Heinz Award in Public Policy in 2008. In 1994, he was appointed by President Bill Clinton to serve on the Bipartisan Commission on Entitlement and Tax Reform. Prior to founding the center, Greenstein was Administrator of the Food and Nutrition Service at the United States Department of Agriculture under President Jimmy Carter. In November 2011, Greenstein was included on The New Republic's list of Washington's most powerful, least famous people.
