= Tad Gormley =

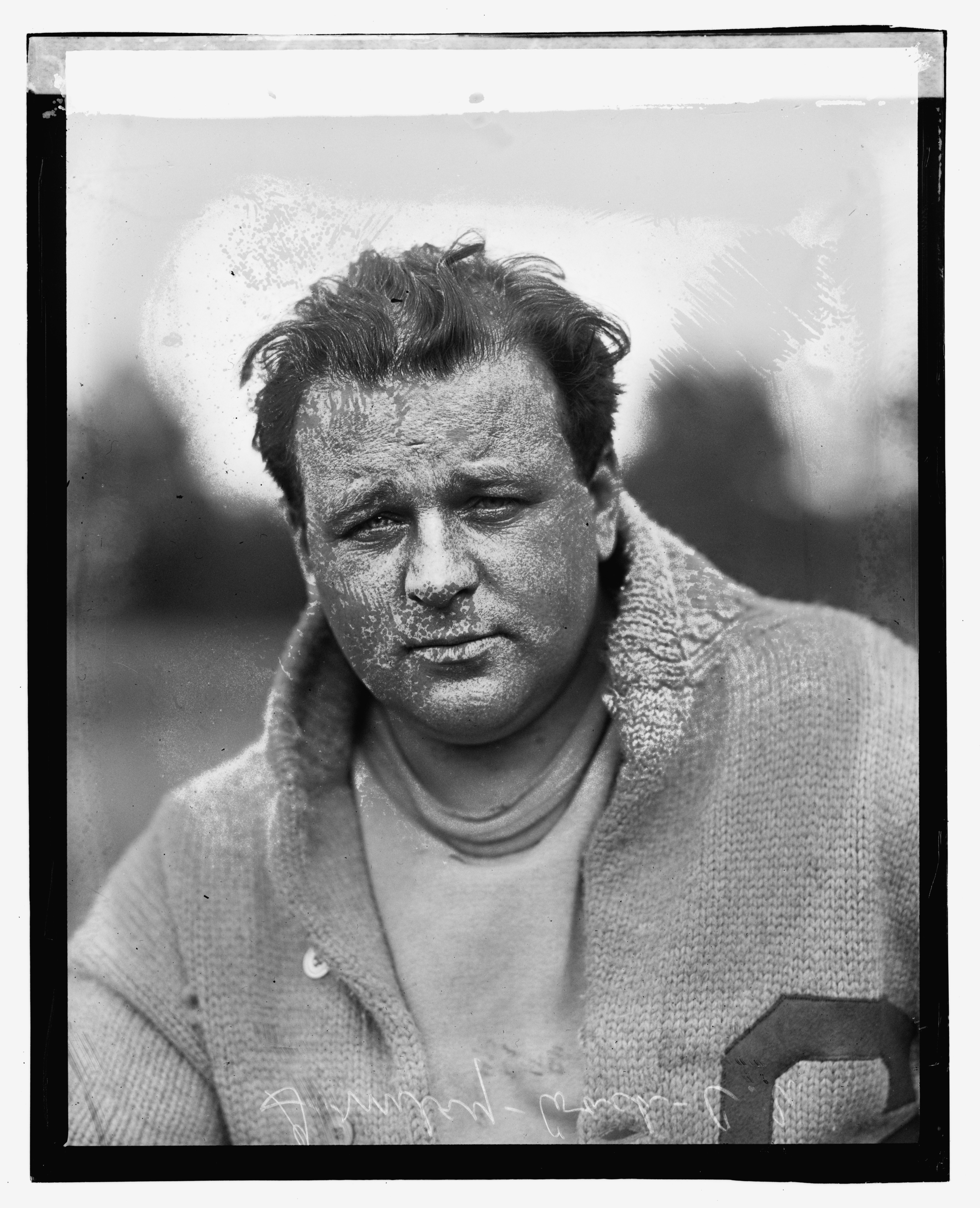
- Gormley in 1923

Biographical details
- Born: December 23, 1883; Cambridge, Massachusetts, U.S.
- Died: December 5, 1965 (76 years); New Orleans, Louisiana, U.S.

Coaching career (HC unless noted)

Basketball
- 1921–1923: LSU
- 1928–1930: Loyola New Orleans

Track and field
- 1914–1915: Tulane
- 1916–1927: LSU
- 1927–1938: Loyola New Orleans

Francis Thomas "Tad" Gormley (December 23, 1883 – December 5, 1965) was an American athletic trainer, coach and official. He was a native of Cambridge, Massachusetts and was the head of the New Orleans Gymnastics Club and Amateur Athletic Union (AAU).

In 1907, Gormley moved to New Orleans to become the physical director at the Young Men's Gymnastics Club, the predecessor to the New Orleans Athletic Club. Gormley served as head trainer at Tulane, LSU and Loyola New Orleans. He was also a game official in the New Orleans Prep School Athletic League for soccer, football and basketball and superintendent of City Park Stadium.

== Coaching career ==
In 1914, Gormley was hired as the track coach at Tulane University. In 1916, he moved to Baton Rouge, Louisiana and at different times was head coach for the men's basketball, boxing, track and field and wrestling teams at Louisiana State University. He served as head coach of the LSU Tigers basketball team from 1921 to 1923, posting a 25–11 record and head coach of the LSU Tigers track and field team from 1916 to 1927.

In 1927, Gormley returned to New Orleans and from 1928 to 1930, he was the head basketball coach at Loyola University New Orleans. While at Loyola, he also served as the boxing and track and field coach.

Gormley was an associate coach for the U.S. Olympic track team at the 1932 Summer Olympics.

== Accolades ==
In 1962, he was elected to the National Athletic Trainers' Association Hall of Fame, the Louisiana Sports Hall of Fame in 1968, the Greater New Orleans Sports Hall of Fame in 1971 and the Louisiana Athletic Trainers’ Hall of Fame in 1990. The former City Park Stadium in City Park, New Orleans was renamed Tad Gormley Stadium in his honor in 1957.

== Personal life ==
He was the uncle of Joseph L. Gormley.
