= Donald Moynihan =

Irish-American political scientist

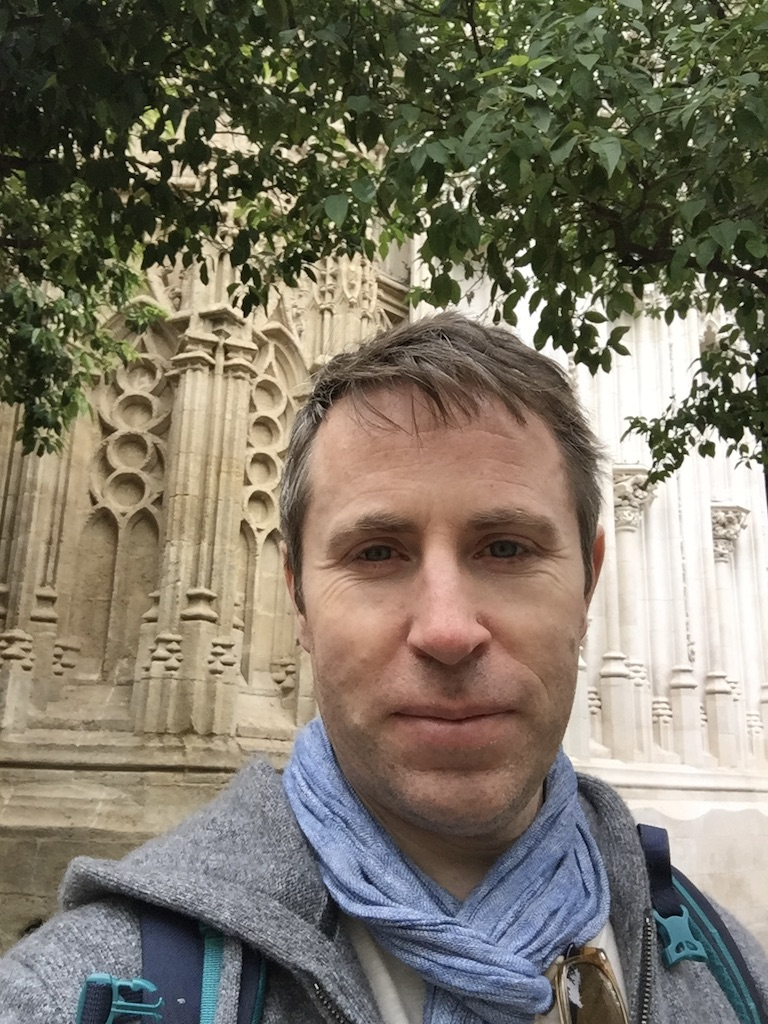
- Born: Ireland
- Spouse: Pamela Herd

Academic background
- Education: BA, public administration, University of Limerick; MA, PhD, public administration, Maxwell School of Citizenship and Public Affairs
- Thesis: Pursuing rationality in public management: managing for results in U.S. State governments (2002)

Academic work
- Institutions: Georgetown University; University of Wisconsin-Madison; Texas A&M University; University of Michigan

Donald P. Moynihan is an Irish-American public administration scholar. He is currently the J. Ira and Nicki Harris Family Professor of Public Policy at the University of Michigan Ford School of Public Policy. He was previously the McCourt Chair at the McCourt School of Public Policy at Georgetown University and on the faculty at the University of Wisconsin-Madison (UW–Madison) and Texas A&M University. From 2023 until 2024, Moynihan served as the President of the Association for Public Policy Analysis and Management.

While at UW–Madison, his book The Dynamics of Performance Management: Constructing Information and Reform was named best book by the Academy of Management's Public and Nonprofit Division and received the Herbert Simon award from the American Political Science Association.

== Early life and education ==
Moynihan completed his Bachelor of Arts degree in public administration at the University of Limerick (1997) and his master's (1998) and Ph.D. (2002) in public administration from the Maxwell School of Citizenship and Public Affairs at Syracuse University.

== Career ==
Upon completing his formal education, Moynihan became an assistant professor at the Bush School of Government and Public Service at Texas A&M University from 2003 until 2005. While there, he received the 2004 Paul Volcker Endowment Junior Scholar Research Grant from the American Political Science Association's Public Administration Section for his article "What Do We Talk About When We Talk About Performance? A Content Analysis of Legislative Discussion of Performance Information." Following this, he accepted a similar position at the Robert M. La Follette School of Public Affairs at the University of Wisconsin-Madison.

During his early years at UW–Madison, Moynihan published The Dynamics of Performance Management: Constructing Information and Reform, which won the Best Book Award from the Public and Nonprofit Division of the Academy of Management. It also received the Herbert Simon award from the American Political Science Association, which honors the book with the most significant influence in public administration scholarship in the last three to five years. In the same year, Moynihan launched the Performance Information Project "to bring together contemporary empirical research on how public services use performance data." He was also one of four faculty members chosen to establish a partnership between the Department of Political Science and the Elections Division of the state's Government Accountability Board. As a result of his academic achievements, Moynihan was one of the youngest members elected to be a Fellow of the United States National Academy of Public Administration and served as a member of the Policy Council of the Association for Public Policy Analysis and Management.

By 2014, Moynihan's work was recognized as among the most influential published by the journal Public Administration Review. His articles were "The Role of Organizations in Fostering Public Service Motivation" and "Pulling the Levers: Transformational Leadership, Public Service Motivation, and Mission Valence". He was later appointed the La Follette School's Jerry and Mary Cotter Faculty Fellow and received the David N. Kershaw Award from the Association for Public Policy Analysis and Management.

Prior to the 2016 United States presidential election, Moynihan co-authored a paper titled "Election Laws, Mobilization, and Turnout: The Unintended Consequences of Electoral Reform", which focused on the effects of election laws to make voting more convenient and increase turnout. The paper won the State Politics and Policy Best Journal Article Award from the American Political Science Association. His research on federal agencies' use of performance management data was referenced in President Barack Obama's proposed U.S. budget for 2016 and 2017. After presenting his research on public sector performance to policymakers at the U.S. Office of Management and Budget, the World Bank and the Organisation for Economic Co-operation and Development (OECD), he received the Leon D. Epstein Distinguished Faculty Research Award from the University of Wisconsin–Madison College of Letters and Science.

Moynihan left UW–Madison in 2018 with his wife Pamela Herd to join the faculty of Georgetown University as the inaugural McCourt Chair at the McCourt School of Public Policy. From 2018 until 2020, Moynihan was a Visiting Professor at the Blavatnik School of Government and an academic visitor at Nuffield College, Oxford.

In Fall 2023, Moynihan was elected President of the Association for Public Policy Analysis and Management, serving until Fall 2024.

In August 2024, Moynihan and Herd joined the University of Michigan Ford School of Public Policy. In January 2025, Moynihan was appointed the J. Ira and Nicki Harris Family Professor of Public Policy.

In 2025, Moynihan and Pamela Herd published "Administrative Burdens in the Social Safety Net" in the Journal of Economic Perspectives, and Moynihan published "Rescuing State Capacity: Proceduralism, the New Politicization, and Public Policy" in the Journal of Policy Analysis and Management. In 2026, Moynihan received the H. George Frederickson Award for Career Contributions from the Public Management Research Association, which honors a scholar whose career reflects sustained, field-shaping contributions to public management research, service, and leadership. That same year, he was named a John Simon Guggenheim Memorial Foundation Fellow, one of 223 fellows selected from nearly 5,000 applicants, for a project examining how the management of public services affects government's capacity to deliver key services and meet democratic accountability standards.

Moynihan is one of the founding co-directors of the Better Government Lab which undertakes rigorous research evaluations to understand how to make government more effective and more accessible. He also writes a blog Can We Still Govern? that analyzes the governance changes that have taken place under the Trump administration, and the ways that technology can reduce administrative burdens.
