= List of multilingual presidents of the Philippines =

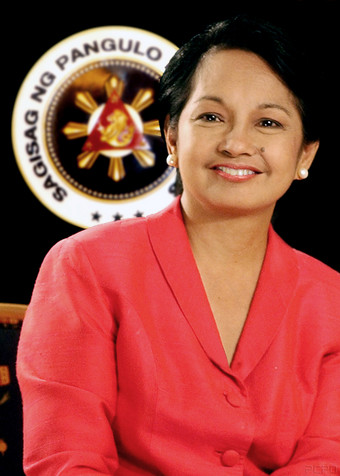
Gloria Macapagal Arroyo is the most multilingual president of the Philippines, being able to speak ten languages.

Of the seventeen presidents of the Philippines, a number have shown proficiency in languages other than English and Tagalog (which would later become the basis of the national language, Filipino).

Of these, only one, Emilio Aguinaldo, was not proficient in English during his tenure, although he, along with a number of other presidents, was proficient in Spanish, a widespread language of the Philippines during his time. Some presidents, meanwhile, have also exhibited proficiency in other Philippine languages, such as Cebuano, Kapampangan and Ilocano, as well as other foreign languages.

== Description by president ==
=== Emilio Aguinaldo ===
Emilio Aguinaldo was a native Tagalog speaker, having been born to a mixed family in Cavite, a Tagalog-speaking province. He was also fluent in Spanish. He is the only president to have taken his oath of office in Spanish since that was the official language of the First Philippine Republic. He likewise addressed the Malolos Congress in Spanish in 1899. Most of Aguinaldo's official documented statements during his presidency were similarly delivered in Spanish, while many other documents were in Tagalog, especially during the Philippine-American War.

Aguinaldo is the only president of the Philippines to have not used English during his tenure. A committed anticolonialist, he never learned English during his lifetime, and on record only briefly spoke it in a speech otherwise spoken in Spanish, which was recorded to film for Fox Movietone News in 1929.

=== Manuel L. Quezon ===
Born and raised in Baler, Tayabas (in his time, it was part of El Principe, Nueva Ecija), Manuel L. Quezon spoke Tagalog, Spanish and, later in life, English. Although Quezon initially refused to learn English, believing that the Americans betrayed the Filipino people after the Philippine Revolution, he began to study the language seriously after befriending Harry Hill Bandholtz, who even offered to pay him to learn the language. He later studied the language again after being elected as Resident Commissioner in 1909, after which he became fluent after a short period of time, and by 1912, he was able to secure a firm pledge from the United States Democratic Party in support of Philippine independence – a pledge that would result in the passage of the Jones Act in 1916.

Although Quezon would primarily use Spanish and English during his political career, he would use Tagalog at home with his family. Notably, he was the first president to address the nation in what would become Filipino, the national language of the Philippines, when he proclaimed its adoption during a radio address on Rizal Day, December 30, 1937.

=== José P. Laurel ===
Originally from Batangas, José P. Laurel is a native Tagalog speaker. During the Second Philippine Republic, he took his oath of office in Tagalog – a first for a Philippine president – and a significant number of speeches made during his presidency were delivered in the language. Notably, Laurel advocated for the adoption of Tagalog as the national language of the Philippines during his tenure.

In addition to Tagalog, Laurel was also fluent in English and Spanish: languages he would use especially during his tenure as an Associate Justice of the Supreme Court of the Philippines during the Commonwealth era, where he penned decisions referencing legal material in both languages.

=== Sergio Osmeña ===
Sergio Osmeña is a native Cebuano speaker, having been born and raised in Cebu City, although he later spent much of his adult life in Manila. He was also fluent in Spanish, having established the newspaper El Nuevo Día (The New Day) with the help of Nicasio Chiong Veloso, a Chinese millionaire and his eventual father-in-law. While serving as vice president to Manuel L. Quezon, Osmeña corresponded with him in Spanish.

Osmeña was also fluent in English, and although he believed in adopting English as a medium of instruction so that, in the words of Sotero Laurel, serve as "a unifying medium and for the purpose of overcoming the barrier of language", he also believed in the adoption of a national language that would be the product of consensus and evolution. As president, he delivered a couple of speeches in Tagalog in 1945, and the following year, he signed a proclamation designating a National Language Week between March 27 and April 2, the precursor to the modern-day Buwan ng Wika celebrated every August.

=== Manuel Roxas ===
Manuel Roxas hails from Capiz, and although several languages are spoken in the province, he was born and raised in the capital, Capiz (modern-day Roxas City), which is predominantly Capiznon-speaking. Capiznon, a smaller Visayan language, is closely related to Hiligaynon, the lingua franca of Panay, and it can be presumed that Roxas was fluent in Hiligaynon as well.

Aside from Capiznon and Hiligaynon, Roxas was also proficient in English, Tagalog and Spanish. During the 1934 Constitutional Convention which was responsible for drafting the 1935 Constitution of the Philippines, Roxas used both Spanish and English during the proceedings, while as president, he delivered an address in Tagalog in 1946.

=== Elpidio Quirino ===
Raised in Ilocos Sur and La Union, Elpidio Quirino natively spoke Ilocano and also spoke Tagalog, English, and Spanish. Quirino frequently wrote love letters in Spanish to his wife, Alicia Syquia Quirino, who remained in Vigan, the capital of Ilocos Sur, with their children while he was working in Manila.

In 1949, Quirino pledged in a radio address that he would not reverse course on the promotion of a Tagalog-based national language, pledging to do everything he can to help realise Manuel L. Quezon's dream of uniting the nation through one national language.

=== Ramon Magsaysay ===
Ramon Magsaysay was born in Zambales, where several languages are spoken. Although his hometown, Iba, was primarily Ilocano-speaking during his time, Magsaysay was born to a mixed non-Ilocano family, with his ancestors coming from Tagalog-speaking Rizal and Cavite and Waray-speaking Catbalogan in Samar. However, Magsaysay identified as Ilocano ethnically, and he was known for his mastery of the language.

Magsaysay's fluency in Tagalog and English would later become focal points of his political career. His fluency in English allowed him to cultivate a deep friendship with Edward Lansdale, who would later be instrumental in his rise to the presidency in 1953, while he popularized Tagalog during his administration. He accepted the diplomatic credentials of Fermín Sanz-Orrio, a Spanish diplomat, in the language.

As the first Philippine president born in the twentieth century, Magsaysay was the first president to be primarily educated in English rather than Spanish, and he is believed to have "scarcely" spoken Spanish.

=== Carlos P. Garcia ===
Carlos P. Garcia was born and raised in Cebuano-speaking Bohol. His mastery of Cebuano manifested in his poetry, which earned him the titles "Prince of Visayan Poets" and "Bard from Bohol", and even leading one to remark that Garcia was more famous for his poems than his presidency.

In addition to his native Cebuano, Garcia spoke fluent English and Spanish, using English when entertaining visitors while using Cebuano and Spanish when at home with his family. Spanish fluency was said to be so instrumental to his political career that had he not learned the language, he would probably have never met Manuel L. Quezon, put under his political tutelage, and set on the path to the presidency.

Although he admitted that it can be difficult for him to use the language, Garcia was also fluent in Tagalog, and he was also proficient in Latin.

=== Diosdado Macapagal ===
Diosdado Macapagal was a native Kapampangan speaker, having been born and raised in Lubao, Pampanga. In addition to English and Tagalog, Macapagal was also fluent in Spanish, which served as the language of his household. He was reported to have spoken the language habitually with his wife, Eva Macapagal, and they raised their children to be fluent in it.

Macapagal was also known for his poetry, having written around 100 poems in his youth and was subsequently regarded in his home province for it. His poetry ultimately served as a springboard for his entry into national politics in 1949, when he was elected to Congress.

=== Ferdinand Marcos ===
Ferdinand Marcos was known for his English skills, and by his high school years was regarded as a skilled orator who spoke at least three languages. A native of Ilocos Norte, Marcos was a native Ilocano speaker, and he has used the language in speeches during his presidency, as well as in his interactions with people in Ilocano-speaking areas.

In addition to Ilocano, Marcos was also fluent in Tagalog and English, and he has switched between all three languages when speaking. He is notable for cultivating the use of the national language as a means of ensuring unity and "Filipino greatness", and mandating its wider adoption in and use by government agencies.

While Marcos advocated for the continued use of Spanish, even restoring its official status after it was removed with the passage of the 1973 Constitution of the Philippines, Spanish-language writer Guillermo Gómez Rivera writes that Marcos initially did not speak Spanish and his non-fluency served U.S. political aims. However, he later writes that Marcos did learn Spanish after marrying his Spanish-speaking wife, Imelda, and he delivered his first speech in the language in 1968 in celebration of the Día de la Hispanidad.

=== Corazon Aquino ===
Corazon Aquino was from Tarlac, and although several languages are spoken in the province, Aquino spoke Kapampangan natively, having been raised in Kapampangan-speaking Tarlac City. During World War II, she learned Japanese as a young girl and one time was even rewarded with a bag of sugar-coated peanuts – a luxury at the time – after perfectly reciting a poem to some Japanese soldiers.

In addition to being fluent in Filipino, by age 18 Aquino was also fluent in English, Spanish and French, which she demonstrated by granting an interview in French during her state visit to France in 1989.

=== Fidel V. Ramos ===
Born and raised in Pangasinan, Fidel V. Ramos spoke the province's two predominant languages, Pangasinan and Ilocano, natively, in addition to being fluent in English and Filipino. He also possesses some fluency in Spanish, which he used in 1998 during the state visit of King Juan Carlos I of Spain and his consort, Queen Sofía, in celebration of the Philippines' centennial.

=== Joseph Estrada ===
Joseph Estrada was raised in the working-class neighborhood of Tondo in Manila. A native Tagalog speaker, Estrada was criticized during the 1998 presidential election for his less-than-perfect English skills, which he later used to win the election by winning sympathy from lower-class voters. While president, Estrada primarily used Filipino in his day-to-day communication, although he has used English in his speeches.

Estrada popularized so-called "carabao English", the broken English that became one of his trademarks as an actor. He frequently makes self-deprecating jokes about his English skills, with entire books published that feature notable jokes and quotations from him spoken in carabao English. One of those books, ERAPtion: How to Speak English Without Really Trial, went on to become a best-seller upon its release in 1994.

=== Gloria Macapagal Arroyo ===
Gloria Macapagal Arroyo is known for her knowledge of other Philippine languages, having used this to her political advantage. Growing up in Pampanga, Cebuano-speaking Iligan in Lanao del Norte and Manila, Arroyo speaks fluent Filipino, Kapampangan and Cebuano, being raised by a Kapampangan-speaking father and a Cebuano-speaking mother. She is also proficient in Ilocano, Hiligaynon, Bikol and Pangasinan, which she has used on a number of occasions while serving as president. Her mother was raised in Ilocano-speaking town of Binalonan, Pangasinan.

Arroyo is the Philippines' most recent hispanophone president, having been raised by her parents to be fluent in the language, although she did not start using the language extensively until later into her presidency, when she made state visits to Spain and Equatorial Guinea in 2007. Despite being a third-language Spanish speaker, during her term she mandated the reintroduction of Spanish as a subject in the Philippine school system. In addition to Spanish, Arroyo also possesses some proficiency in French, which she used on her visit to Canada in 2002.

=== Benigno Aquino III ===
Although Benigno Aquino III was born to Kapampangan-speaking parents, he was raised in Manila and grew up speaking English and Filipino. Notably, Aquino is the first president to deliver a State of the Nation Address (SONA) entirely in Filipino, having done so during his inaugural SONA in 2010 and, despite criticism, every SONA he has delivered since then. Nonetheless, he has been credited with making the presidency more relatable to the people through his consistent use of Filipino, in contrast to his predecessors.

While Aquino studied Spanish in school, he has admitted to not speaking the language well. However, he has used the language in his speeches when welcoming foreign dignitaries from Spanish-speaking countries or when opening cultural events in the Philippines related to Spain.

=== Rodrigo Duterte ===
Rodrigo Duterte was born in Cebuano-speaking Southern Leyte, and later spent his childhood in Cebu before moving to Davao City at the age of six. Despite being raised in a primarily Cebuano-speaking environment, Duterte is also fluent in Filipino and English, and has admitted to being partially fluent in Hiligaynon.

Duterte is known for his brash, irreverent style of speaking, which he says is him posturing as a radical to challenge the Philippines' political elite, although one has remarked that this style is due to his "inadequate" command of Filipino compared to his Cebuano. A columnist for the Bohol Chronicle, Jes B. Tirol, meanwhile suggests that Duterte is likewise misunderstood in English because he speaks in English through a Cebuanophone psychological lens, as evidenced by his infamous "rape joke" where he supposedly derided an Australian missionary who was raped and killed during a prison riot and hostage crisis at the Davao Metropolitan District Command Center in 1989.

=== Bongbong Marcos ===
Although Bongbong Marcos was the son of an Ilocano-speaking father and a Waray-speaking mother, he was raised in Manila and grew up speaking English and Filipino. In a 2013 interview with Lourd de Veyra, he admitted that his Ilocano was "weak", though he considers himself to be at least passively fluent in both his parents' native languages, and his children were raised to be native Ilocano speakers.

== Comparison table ==
=== Languages spoken in the Philippines ===
| President | Tagalog Filipino | English | Spanish | Cebuano | Kapampangan | Ilocano | Bikol | Hiligaynon | Pangasinan | Capiznon | Waray |
|---|---|---|---|---|---|---|---|---|---|---|---|
| Emilio Aguinaldo | Native | Partial | Fluent | | | | | | | | |
| Manuel L. Quezon | Native | Fluent | Native | | | | | | | | |
| José P. Laurel | Native | Fluent | Fluent | | | | | | | | |
| Sergio Osmeña | Fluent | Fluent | Fluent | Native | | | | | | | |
| Manuel Roxas | Fluent | Fluent | Fluent | | | | | Native | | Native | |
| Elpidio Quirino | Fluent | Fluent | Fluent | | | Native | | | | | |
| Ramon Magsaysay | Native | Fluent | | | | Native | | | | | |
| Carlos P. Garcia | Fluent | Fluent | Fluent | Native | | | | | | | |
| Diosdado Macapagal | Fluent | Fluent | Fluent | | Native | | | | | | |
| Ferdinand Marcos | Fluent | Fluent | Partial | | | Native | | | | | |
| Corazon Aquino | Fluent | Fluent | Fluent | | Native | | | | | | |
| Fidel V. Ramos | Fluent | Fluent | Partial | | | Native | | | Native | | |
| Joseph Estrada | Native | Fluent | | | | | | | | | |
| Gloria Macapagal Arroyo | Native | Fluent | Fluent | Native | Native | Fluent | Fluent | Fluent | Fluent | | |
| Benigno Aquino III | Native | Fluent | Partial | | | | | | | | |
| Rodrigo Duterte | Fluent | Fluent | | Native | | | | Partial | | | |
| Bongbong Marcos | Native | Fluent | | | | Partial | | | | | Partial |

=== Foreign languages ===
| President | French | Japanese | Latin |
|---|---|---|---|
| Carlos P. Garcia | | | Fluent |
| Corazon Aquino | Fluent | Fluent | |
| Gloria Macapagal Arroyo | Partial | | |

== See also ==
- List of multilingual presidents of the United States
