= Kiera Gormley =

Kiera Gormley is a model from Belfast in Northern Ireland. She caught the eye of Mario Testino, leading to shoots for Vogue UK and Italy, ID, Burberry, Aquascutum, Aveda, and Jaeger.

Gormley is represented by Storm Model Management in London, Marilyn agency in New York and Paris, and Women Model Management Milan.

Gormley has worked for Gaultier, Dior, Lanvin, Vivienne Westwood, Hermes, Paul Smith, Burberry, Maison Martin Margiela, Biba, Giorgio Armani, and many more. She became the face of MAC Cosmetics in the "Rose romance" campaign, shot by Miles Aldridge.
