= Maria Cancian =

American economist and university administrator

Maria Cancian is an American economist and former dean of the McCourt School of Public Policy at Georgetown University.

== Education ==
Cancian received a B.A. from Swarthmore College, and an M.A. and Ph.D., both in economics, from the University of Michigan.

== Academic career and interests ==
Cancian is a scholar of public policy and specializes in family policy and family well-being. During the Obama administration, she served as Senior Advisor to the United States Secretary of Health and Human Services and Deputy Assistant Secretary for Policy in the Administration for Children and Families of the United States Department of Health and Human Services. Prior to joining the McCourt School, Cancian served as Associate Dean for Social Sciences and Fiscal Initiatives, Director of the Institute for Research on Poverty, and a professor at the University of Wisconsin-Madison's Robert M. La Follette School of Public Affairs. She resigned as dean of the McCourt school in November, 2024.

Cancian serves on the board of the directors of Mathematica, Inc. She was elected a Galbraith Fellow of the American Academy of Political and Social Science, fellow of the American Academy of Social Work and Social Welfare, and is a former president of the Association for Public Policy Analysis and Management.
