= Beatrice Gormley =

American writer (born 1942)

Beatrice Gormley (born October 15, 1942) is an American writer who specializes in biographies for children. She has published a number of books with publishers such as Simon & Schuster and Scholastic.

== Biography ==
Gormley was born in Glendale, California. She wanted to be a writer since the age of 9, because she loved to read.

She is a graduate of Pomona College and has worked as a book editor.

In 1979, she wrote her first book. At 39 years old, she had her first book published.

Beatrice visits many schools and validates the importance of revision and rewriting.

In 2008, she authored a biography: Barack Obama, Our 44th President. Her 2021 picture book, Joe Biden: Our 46th President appeared on the 2022 Bank Street Children's Book Committee's Best Books of the Year List.

Beatrice is currently writing a historical novel for kids.

== Personal life ==
Beatrice and her husband Robert, an editor, live in Massachusetts. They have two daughters together, Katie and Jenny.

== Books by Beatrice Gormley ==
- Poisoned Honey, A Story of Mary Magdalene, Knopf, 2010. 978-0-375-85207-7
- Salome, a novel, Knopf, April 2007. 978-0-375-83908-5
- Adara, a novel, Eerdmans, 2002. 0-8028-5216-5
- Miriam, a novel. Eerdmans, 1999. 0-8028-5156-8
- C. S. Lewis, The Man Behind Narnia, Wm. B. Eerdmans, 2005. 0-8028-5301-3
- First Ladies, Women Who Called The White House Home, Scholastic, 2004. 0-590-25518-5
- Louisa May Alcott, Young Novelist (Childhood of Famous Americans series), Aladdin Paperbacks (Simon & Schuster), 1999. 0-689-82025-9
- Amelia Earhart, Young Aviator (Childhood of Famous Americans), Aladdin Paperbacks (Simon & Schuster), 2000. 0-689-83188-9
- Laura Ingalls Wilder, Young Pioneer (Childhood of Famous Americans series), Aladdin Paperbacks (Simon & Schuster), 2001. 0-689-83924-3
- Jacqueline KENNEDY ONASSIS, Friend of the Arts (Childhood of Famous Americans), Aladdin Paperbacks (Simon & Schuster), 2002. 0-689-85295-9
- Laura Bush, America’s First Lady, Aladdin Paperbacks (Simon & Schuster), 2003. 0-689-85366-1
- Maria Mitchell, The Soul of an Astronomer Wm. B. Eerdmans, 2nd ed. 2004. 0-8028-5264-5
- Althea Gibson, Young Tennis Player (Childhood of Famous Americans), Aladdin (Simon & Schuster), 2005. 0-689-87187-2
- Diana, Princess of Wales, Young Royalty (Childhood of World Figures), Aladdin (Simon & Schuster), 2005. 1-4169-0021-7
- Julius Caesar, Young Statesman (Childhood of World Figures), Aladdin (Simon & Schuster), 2006. 978-1-4169-1281-1
- Marie Curie, Young Scientist (Childhood of World Figures), Aladdin (Simon & Schuster), 2007. 9-781-4169-1545-4
- Back to the Titanic! (Travelers Through Time #1) Scholastic (Apple), 1994. 0-590-46226-1
- Back to Paul Revere! (Travelers Through Time # 2) Scholastic (Apple), 1994. 0-590-46227-X
- Back to the Day Lincoln Was Shot! (Travelers Through Time #3) Scholastic (Apple),1994. 0-590-46228-8
- Mail-Order Wings, Dutton, 1981. 0-595-15204-x
- Fifth Grade Magic, Dutton, 1982. 0-525-44007-0
- Best Friend Insurance, Dutton, 1983. 0-525-44066-6
- The Ghastly Glasses, Dutton, 1985. 0-525-44215-4
- Richard and the Vratch, Avon Camelot, 1987 0-380-75207-7
- Paul's Volcano, Houghton Mifflin, 1987. 0-395-43079-8
- More Fifth Grade Magic, Dutton, 1989 0-595-15203-1
- Wanted: UFO, Dutton, 1990. 0-525-44593-5
- Sky Guys to White Cat, Dutton, 1991. 0-525-44743-1
- Ellie's Birthstone Ring, Dutton, 1992. 0-525-44969-8
