= William T. Gormley =

William T. Gormley (born August 7, 1950) is Distinguished University Professor Emeritus, Georgetown University. Gormley, a scholar of child care and education and bureaucratic politics, is also the co-director of the Center for Research on Children in the U.S. Gormley's research on Tulsa's universal pre-K program has been covered by multiple news outlets, including PBS, NPR, the CBS Evening News, and the New York Times.

== Biography ==
Gormley grew up in Pittsburgh, Pennsylvania, and received his B.A. from the University of Pittsburgh in political science in 1972. In 1976, he received his Ph.D. from the University of North Carolina at Chapel Hill, also in political science. He then taught at the State University of New York and the University of Wisconsin, from 1980 to 1990. In 1991, Gormley became a professor of government and public policy at Georgetown University, later becoming a University Professor. He served as interim dean of the Georgetown Public Policy Institute from 2008 to 2010. Gormley retired from Georgetown University in 2023, to become a murder mystery writer. Gormley's first murder mystery, Too Many Bridges, set in Pittsburgh, was published by Level Best Books in August 2024. In a review for Pittsburgh Quarterly, Fred Shaw said that Gormley "nailed" the police procedural genre with his debut novel. His second mystery, The Silent Trumpet, will be published in August 2025. Since March 2024, Gormley has hosted a podcast, Profs on Cops, where he interviews criminologists about police practices and procedures.

Gormley's wife is a professor at George Mason University, and he has a stepson and a daughter. In 2000, Gormley was elected as a fellow of the National Academy of Public Administration.

== Publications ==
=== Books ===
- The Silent Trumpet. (Level Best Books, 2025) (by Bill Gormley)
- Too Many Bridges. (Level Best Books, 2024) (by Bill Gormley).
- The Critical Advantage: Critical Thinking and K-12 Education (Cambridge, Mass.: Harvard Education Press, 2017).
- Voices for Children: Rhetoric and Public Policy (Brookings Institution Press, 2012).
- Bureaucracy and Democracy: Accountability and Performance with Steven Balla (Washington, D.C.: Congressional Quarterly Press, 3rd ed., 2013): Analysis of bureaucracy centered "around four prominent social theories: bounded rationality, principal-agent theory, interest group mobilization, and network theory."
- Politics and Public Policy with Carl Van Horn and Donald Baumer (Washington, D.C.:Congressional Quarterly Press, 2001, 3rd edition).
- Organizational Report Cards with David Weimer (Cambridge, Mass.: Harvard University Press, 1999)).
- Everybody's Children: Child Care as a Public Problem (Washington, D.C.: The Brookings Institution, 1995).
- Privatization and its Alternatives edited (Madison: University of Wisconsin Press, 1991): Presents 14 different perspectives on privatization. Gormley provides a "unifying framework" in his introduction.
- Taming the Bureaucracy: Muscles, Prayers, and Other Strategies (Princeton: Princeton University Press, 1989).
- The Midwest Response to the New Federalism edited with Peter Eisinger (Madison: University of Wisconsin Press, 1988).
- The Politics of Public Utility Regulation (Pittsburgh: University of Pittsburgh Press, 1983).
- The Effects of Newspaper-Television Cross-Ownership on News Homogeneity (Chapel Hill: Institute for Research in Social Science, 1976).
