= Joseph L. Gormley =

Joseph Leo Gormley
- Born: May 22, 1914; Clinton, Massachusetts
- Died: June 6, 2004 (aged 90)
- Education: Georgetown University
- Alma mater: Boston College
- Occupation(s): Chief of chemistry and toxicology for the FBI
- Spouse: Frances Gormley
- Children: 9

Joseph Leo Gormley (May 22, 1914 – June 6, 2004) was the chief of chemistry and toxicology for the FBI.

Born in Clinton, Massachusetts, he was raised in Somerville, Massachusetts. Gormley received his bachelor's and master's degrees in chemistry from Boston College. With his wife Frances he fathered and raised nine children.

In 1940, he moved to Washington, D.C., and joined the Federal Bureau of Investigation. Gormley earned two law degrees from Georgetown University and a master's degree in forensic science from George Washington University.

He spent more than thirty three years with the FBI, investigating some of the agency's most famous cases, including the Great Brinks Robbery in 1950 and the 1964 murders of three young civil rights workers, which became known as the "Mississippi Burning" case. He served as an expert witness in numerous trials, testifying on his knowledge of chemistry, toxicology and arson. For more than 20 years, Gormley supervised a program that developed the use of lie detector tests for investigative purposes.

He retired from the FBI in 1973, and moved temporarily to Maine to direct the Maine State Police Crime Laboratory. After returning to the Washington, D.C., area he worked in the research and training divisions of the International Association of Chiefs of Police. In addition to his work at the IACP, Gormley worked as a consultant for law enforcement matters in his later years. The former president of the Mid-Atlantic Association of Forensic Scientists, Gormley also taught at George Washington University and the University of Maryland College Park. He is remembered as one of the fathers of modern forensic science.
